This list of foreign football players in India consists of players who are currently playing or have played in India, either in top division leagues like Indian Super League, I-League, I-League 2nd Division, or in regional competitions such as Calcutta Football League, Goa Professional League, alongside domestic knock-out tournaments such as the IFA Shield and Durand Cup.

 All these players have joined or played or contracted as foreign recruit or footballer for the football clubs all over India. 
 The following players must meet both of the following criteria:
 A player who joined any Indian football club (irrespective of whether he made an appearance for the team or not).
 A player is considered foreign if he is not eligible to play for the India national team.
 Bold denotes players who have appeared or included in the squad in any edition of the FIFA World Cup.

Naturalized player(s)

East Pakistan 
 Tarapada Ray – East Bengal FC (1954–1955)
 Balai Dey – East Bengal FC (1965–1967)

Japan 
 Arata Izumi – East Bengal FC (2006–2007) Mahindra United (2007–2009) Pune FC (2009–2015) Atlético de Kolkata (2015) Mumbai FC (2016) FC Pune City (2016) NEROCA FC (2017) Kerala Blasters FC (2017–2018)

Afghanistan
 Ahmad Hatifi – Mumbai F.C. (2013–2014)
 Balal Arezou – Churchill Brothers SC (2013)
 Djelaludin Sharityar – Mumbai F.C. (2017)
 Hashmatullah Barakzai – Mumbai F.C. (2013)
 Hamidullah Karimi – Delhi United FC (2015–2017) Meghe United (2018)
 Masih Saighani – Aizawl F.C. (2017–2018), Chennaiyin F.C. (2019–2020)
 Mujtaba Faiz – Air India FC (2013)
 Sandjar Ahmadi – Mumbai F.C. (2013–2014)
 Ismail Aseel – FC Kerala (2018–2019) Kalighat Milan Sangha (2019–2020)
 Mohammad Mashriqi – Bhawanipore FC (2013–2014)
 Maruf Fazly – Hindustan F.C. (2018–2020)
 Faysal Shayesteh – Gokulam Kerala F.C. (2017–2018)
 Zohib Islam Amiri – Mumbai F.C. (2011–2014) Dempo SC (2014–2015) DSK Shivajians F.C. (2016) Mohun Bagan A.C. (2016) Chennai City F.C. (2017) Gokulam Kerala F.C. (2019–2020) Real Kashmir FC (2020–present)
 Jamil Nasiri – Mohammedan Sporting (2019–2020)
 Sharif Mukhammad – Gokulam Kerala FC (2020–present)
 Farshad Noor – Gokulam Kerala FC (2022–present)

Algeria
 Yannis Bessaa – NEROCA FC (2020–2021)

Andorra

 Óscar Sonejee – Churchill Brothers SC (2008)

Angola

 Amestrong Alexandré – Hindustan FC (2017–2018) Vajra United (2019–2020)

Argentina
 Diego Nadaya – Mumbai City F.C. (2014–2015)
 Fabricio Ortiz – Gokulam Kerala F.C. (2018)
 Facundo Cardozo – Mumbai City FC (2016)
 Gastón Sangoy – Mumbai City FC (2016)
 Gustavo Oberman – FC Pune City (2016)
 Julian Camino – East Bengal F.C. (1988)
 Maximiliano Barreiro – NorthEast United FC (2019–2020)
 Maximiliano Álvarez – Chirag United Kerala FC (2008–2009)
 Martín Pérez Guedes – Odisha FC (2019–2020)
 Matías Defederico – Mumbai City FC (2016)
 Matías Verón – Aizawl FC (2020), (2021–present)
 Nicolás Vélez – NorthEast United FC (2015)
 Robertino Pugliara – FC Pune City (2017–2018)
 Diego Colotto – FC Pune City (2015–2016)
 Germán Gonzalo Cabrera – Vasco S.C. (2013)
 Omar Sebastián Monesterolo – East Bengal F.C. (2009–2010)
 Javier López – North East United FC (2015–2016)
 Facundo Pereyra – Kerala Blasters FC (2020–2021)
 Jorge Pereyra Díaz – Kerala Blasters FC (2021–2022) Mumbai City FC (2022–present)
 Diego Bielkiewicz – Rajasthan United FC (2021–2022)
 Mauro dos Santos – Rajasthan United FC (2022–present)
 Juan Carlos Nellar – Gokulam Kerala FC (2022–present)
 Alexis Gómez – Sudeva Delhi FC (2023–present)

Armenia
 Apoula Edël Bete – ATK (2014) Chennaiyin F.C. (2015) FC Pune City (2016)
 Emil Vartazarian – Mohammedan S.C. (2001–2002) Bengal Mumbai FC (2003–2004)

Australia
 Andrew Barisić – East Bengal FC (2013) Kerala Blasters FC (2014)
 Chris Herd – Chennaiyin FC (2018–2019)
 Jerrad Tyson – Chennai City FC (2018)
 Simon Colosimo – Dempo SC (2013–2014)
 David Williams – ATK (2019–2020) ATK Mohun Bagan (2020–2022)
 Diogo Ferreira – Mohun Bagan AC (2017)
 Eli Babalj – ATK (2018)
 Matthew Foschini – Salgaocar SC (2013–2014)
 Jason Jude Starr – Sudeva Moonlight FC (2019–2020)
 Steve Hayes – United Sikkim FC (2013)
 Antun Kovacic – Churchill Brothers SC (2011–2012)
 Michael Matricciani – Chirag United Kerala (2011–2012)
 Matthew Mayora – Southern Samity (2012) Shillong Lajong FC (2012)
 Nicholas Andrew Ward – NEROCA FC (2018–2019)
 James Meyer – Pune FC (2013–2014)
 Srećko Mitrović – East Bengal FC (2009–2010)
 Dario Vidošić – ATK (2019–2020)
 Keegan Nash – Prayag United SC (2009)
 Tim Cahill –Jamshedpur FC (2018–2019)
 Tolgay Özbey – East Bengal FC (2010–2012) Mohun Bagan AC (2012–2013) Mohammedan Sporting (2013) FC Goa (2014) Dempo SC (2014–2015)
 Erik Paartalu – Bengaluru FC (2017–2021)
 Mirjan Pavlović – Pune FC (2014)
 Chris Payne – East Bengal FC (2017)
 Sean Rooney – Salgaocar SC (2012) Bengaluru FC (2013–2015)
 Milan Susak – East Bengal FC (2014–2015)
 Cameron Watson – Bengaluru FC (2016–2017) Mohun Bagan AC (2018)
 Aryn Williams – NEROCA FC (2017–2019)
 Daniell Zeleny – Mohun Bagan AC (2011–2012) Churchill Brothers (2014)
 Okwy Diamondstar – Mohun Bagan AC (2010–2011)
 Matthew Grbesa – United Sports Club (2009–2010)
 Simon Storey – Mohun Bagan AC (2011–2012)
 Emile Demey – Fateh Hyderabad A.F.C. (2018–2019)
 Josh Maguire – Sporting Clube De Goa (2010–2011)
 Joel Chianese – Hyderabad FC (2020–present)
 James Donachie – FC Goa (2020–2021)
 Jacob Tratt – Odisha FC (2020–2021)
 Dylan Fox – NorthEast United FC (2020–2021) FC Goa (2021–2022)
 Scott Neville – SC East Bengal (2020–2021)
 Nick Fitzgerald – Jamshedpur FC (2020–2021)
 Jordan Murray – Kerala Blasters FC (2020–2021) Jamshedpur FC (2021–2022)
 Travis Paul Major – RoundGlass Punjab (2021–present)
 Tomislav Mrcela – SC East Bengal (2021–2022)
 Patrick Flottmann – NorthEast United FC (2021–2022)
 Osama Malik – Odisha FC (2022–present)
 Brendan Hamill – ATK Mohun Bagan FC (2022–present)
 Rostyn Griffiths – Mumbai City FC (2022–present)
 Dimitri Petratos – ATK Mohun Bagan FC (2022–present)
 Aleksandar Jovanovic – Bengaluru FC (2022–present)
 Harry Sawyer – Jamshedpur FC (2022–present)
 Jordan O'Doherty – East Bengal FC (2022–present)
 Aaron Evans – NorthEast United FC (2022–present)

Austria
 Marko Stanković – FC Pune City (2017–2019) Hyderabad FC (2019–2020)
 Emmanuel Akwuegbu – Sporting Clube De Goa (2010–2011)
 Marco Sahanek – NorthEast United (2022)

Bahrain
 Mahmood Mahdi Al-Ajmi – Gokulam Kerala FC (2018)
 Mohammed Nabeel – Air India FC (2009–2010)
 Thiago Fernandes – Gokulam Kerala F.C. (2018)

Bangladesh

 Alfaz Ahmed – Mohun Bagan A.C. (2000–2001)
  Charles Apu – East Bengal F.C. (1985–1986)
 Jamal Bhuyan – Mohammedan Sporting Club (2020–2021)
 Rizvi Karim Rumi – East Bengal F.C. (1991–1992)
 Monem Munna – East Bengal F.C. (1990–1991) (1998)
 Sheikh Mohammad Aslam – East Bengal FC (1990–1991)
 Nurul Haque Manik – Mohammedan Sporting Club (1991–1992)
 Golam Mohammad Gaus – East Bengal F.C. (1991–1992)
 Zakaria Pintoo – Mohammedan Sporting Club (1974)
 Rakib Hussein – East Bengal F.C. (1994–1995)
 Rumman Bin Wali Sabbir – Mohammedan Sporting Club (1991–1992)
 Mizanur Rahman Mizan – East Bengal F.C. (1994–1995)
 Mamunul Islam – Athletico De Kolkata (2014)
 Imtiaz Ahmed Nakib – Mohun Bagan A.C. (2000–2001)
 Mohammed Ali Reza – Tollygunge Agragami FC (2001)
 Mohammed Monwar Hossain – Mahindra United FC (1998–1999)
 Kaiser Hamid – Mohammedan Sporting (1991)
 Mohammed Jewel Rana – Mohun Bagan A.C. (1998–2000)

Barbados
 Samuel Matthew Gibson – Bhawanipore FC (2011–2012)

Bermuda
 Keith Jennings – FC Kochin (1998–2000)
 Eugene Dean – FC Kochin (1998–1999)

Belarus
 Dzmitry Kowb – Minerva Punjab FC (2017)
 Ivan Veras – Aizawl FC (2023–present)

Belgium
 Benjamin Lambot – NorthEast United FC (2020–2021) 
 Kristof Van Hout – Delhi Dynamos F.C. (2014–2015)
 Robin Bounougou Edoa – Pune F.C. (2007–2008)
 Wim Raymaekers – Delhi Dynamos F.C. (2014–2015)

Benin
 Coffi Edem Agbessi – Mohun Bagan A.C. (2005–2006)
 Obinna Winners Onyia – FC Kochin (2000–2001)
 Romuald Boco – Kalyani Bharat FC (2015)

Bhutan
 Chencho Gyeltshen – Minerva Punjab FC (2017–2018) Bengaluru FC (2018–2019) NEROCA FC (2019) RoundGlass Punjab FC (2020–2021) Kerala Blasters FC (2021–2022)
 Lhendup Dorji – Lonestar Kashmir F.C. (2019–2020)
 Chencho Nio – Royal Wahingdoh (2011–2012) Luangmual F.C. (2012–2013)
 Chencho Dorji – Royal Wahingdoh FC (2011–2012)
 Chimi Dorji – FC Kerala (2018–2019)
 Choki Wangchuk – ARA F.C. (2018–2020)
 Tshering Dorji – Madhya Bharat SC (2018) Aizawl F.C. (2019) South United F.C. (2019–2020)
 Sonam Tenzin – Buddhist Blue Stars (2004–2013)
 Kezang Dorji – Khemat FC Uppa (2016–2017) Capital Complex FC (2019–2020)
 Lungtok Dawa – Quartz F.C. (2018–2019)
 Biren Basnet – Kenkre F.C. (2017) Quartz F.C. (2018–2019)
 Karma Shedrup Tshering – Gangtok Himalayan SC (2013)
 Jigme Tshering Dorji – Muthoot FA (2022–present)

Bosnia and Herzegovina
 Srećko Mitrović – East Bengal FC (2009–2010)
 Nedo Turković – NEROCA FC (2017–2018)
 Saša Kolunija – DSK Shivajians (2016–2017)
 Nenad Novaković – Churchill Brothers S.C. (2018–2019)
 Vladimir Molerović – Chennai City FC (2020–2021)
 Enes Sipović – Chennaiyin FC (2020–2021) Kerala Blasters FC (2021–2022)
 Ismar Tandir – Mohamedan Sporting (2021–2022)
 Adnan Šećerović – RoundGlass Punjab FC (2022–present)

Botswana
 Ofentse Nato – Atlético de Kolkata (2014–2016)

Bulgaria
 Dimitar Berbetov – Kerala Blasters FC (2017)
 Georji Ventseslavov Bizev – Chirag United Kerala (2006–2007)

Brazil
 Adilson Carlos – NorthEast United FC (2017)
 Alex Willian – Mumbai F.C. (2017)
 André Luiz Rodrigues – Ozone FC (2018)
 Alex Monteiro Lima – Jamshedpur FC (2020–2022) East Bengal Club (2022–present)
 Amaury Nunes – Churchill Brothers S.C. (2010–2011)
 André Santos – FC Goa (2014)
 Anderson Reberio – Dempo S.C. (1998–1999)
 Alan Henrique Costa – Bengaluru FC (2021–present)
 Roberto Carlos – Delhi Dynamos FC (2015)
 Cleiton Silva – Bengaluru FC (2020–2022) East Bengal Club (2022–present)
 Diego Maurício – Odisha FC (2020–2021) Mumbai City FC (2022) Odisha FC (2022–present)
 Fábio Pena – Shillong Lajong F.C. (2016–2017)
 Anderson Raimundo Silva – Mumbai F.C. (2016–2017)
 Beto – Mohun Bagan A.C. (2004–2005), Dempo S.C. (2005–2011, Churchill Brothers S.C. (2012–13), Dempo S.C. (2013–2014)
 Ossius Luis Ferreira – East Bengal F.C. (1999–2000)
 Deyvison Rogério da Silva – Hyderabad FC (2019–2020)
 Bruno Perone – Kerala Blasters FC (2015)
 Otacilio Brito Alves – Mumbai City FC (2016)
 Charles – Chennai City F.C. (2017) East Bengal F.C. (2017–2018)
 Chicão – Delhi Dynamos FC (2015)
 Cristiano Hilario Oliveira – East Bengal F.C. (2006–2007)
 Danilo – NorthEast United FC (2017–2018)
 Danilo Quipapá – Minerva Punjab FC (2019–2020) Roundglass Punjab (2020–2021)
 Rodrigo Calisto de Almeida – Mahindra United FC (2004–2005)
 Diego Carlos – FC Pune City (2017–2019) Mumbai City F.C. (2019–2020)
 Diego Patriota – TRAU F.C. (2020)
 Éder Montairo – Chennaiyin FC (2015) Salgaocar F.C. (2016) Chennaiyin FC (2016)
 Edmar Figueira – Pune FC (2009–2011), Rangdajied United F.C. (2013–2014)
 Edmilson Marques Pardal – Chirag United SC (2009–2010), East Bengal F.C. (2012–2013)
 Eli Sabiá Filho – Chennaiyin FC (2016–2017), (2018–2021) Jamshedpur FC (2021–present)
 Éverton Santos – Mumbai City FC (2017–2018), ATK (2018–2019)
 Fábio Neves – NorthEast United (2016)
 Fabio Vidal – Mohun Bagan A.C. (2006–2007) Churchill Brothers S.C. (2007–2009)
 Gabriel Lima Silva – Kerala United FC (2021–present)
 Gustavo Silva Conceição – Mohun Bagan A.C. (2015)
 Hudson Lima Da Silva – Mohun Bagan A.C. (2011–2012), Bhawanipore F.C. (2012–2013)
 Gustavo Lazzaretti – NorthEast United (2016)
 Jairo Rodrigues – Kerala Blasters FC (2019)
 Saulo De Aquino – ARA FC (2020–2021)
 Jonatan Lucca – FC Goa (2015), FC Pune City (2016–2018)
 Jose Ramirez Barreto – Mohun Bagan A.C. (1999–2003), Mahindra United FC (2005–2006), Mohun Bagan A.C. (2006–2012)
 Josimar – United Sports Club (2009–2012) Salgaocar SC (2013) Mohammedan Sporting Club (2013–2014) Mumbai F.C. (2015) Dempo S.C. (2015–2016)
 Julio César – FC Goa (2016)
 Léo Mourã – FC Goa (2015)
 Léo Costa – Mumbai City FC (2016–2018)
 Luciano Sabrosa – Mohammedan S.C. (Kolkata) (2013–2014) Pune F.C. (2014–2015) FC Goa (2015) Mohun Bagan A.C. (2016) FC Goa (2016)
 Lucas Luiz Scalon – Chennai City F.C. (2017)
 Mailson Alves – Chennaiyin FC (2015), NorthEast (2016) Chennaiyin FC (2017–2019)
 Manoel Morais Amorim – NorthEast United FC (2016)
 Marcel Sacramento – TRAU F.C. (2019–2020)
 Marcelinho Leite Pereira – Delhi Dynamos FC (2016) FC Pune City (2017–2019) Hyderabad FC (2019–2020) Odisha FC (2020–2021) ATK Mohun Bagan FC (2021) Rajasthan United FC (2021–2022) NorthEast United FC (2022)
 Marcinho – NorthEast United FC (2017–2018)
 Márcio Rosário – Mumbai City FC (2017–2018)
 Marcio Silva Santos – Chennai City F.C. (2018)
 Marcos Thank – Chennai City F.C. (2017)
 Memo – Delhi Dynamos FC (2016) Jamshedpur FC (2017–2020) Chennaiyin FC (2020–2021)
 Paquito – East Bengal F.C. (2004–2005)
 Paulinho Dias – Delhi Dynamos FC (2017–2018)
 Rafael Bastos – Mumbai City F.C. (2018–2019)
 Rafael Coelho – FC Goa (2015–2016)
 Rafael Crivellaro – Chennaiyin FC (2019–present)
 Rafael Dumas – FC Goa (2016)
 Raphael Augusto – Chennaiyin FC (2015–2019), Bengaluru F.C. (2019–2020)
 Richarlyson Barbosa – FC Goa (2016)
 Roberto Volpato – Mumbai City FC (2016)
 Roberto Bressa da Silva – Vasco S.C. (2007–2008)
 Robert William Souza – Ozone FC (2018) Minerva Punjab FC (2018)
 Rodrigo Arroz – Kerala Blasters FC (2015)
 Sérgio Barboza – Minerva Punjab FC (2019–2020) Minerva Delhi FC (2021–present)
 Thiago Santos – Mumbai City FC (2017–2018)
 Trindade Gonçalves – FC Goa (2016) Jamshedpur FC (2017–2018)
 Uilliams – Shillong Lajong F.C. (2013–2016)
 Valci Júnior – Punjab F.C. (2020)
 Victor Simões – FC Goa (2015)
 Vinícius – Delhi Dynamos FC (2015)
 Ossius Luiz Ferreira – East Bengal F.C. (1999–2000)
 Elano Blumer – Chennaiyin FC (2014–2015)
 Bruno Pelissari – Chennaiyin FC  (2014–2015) Delhi Dynamos FC (2016), Gokulam Kerala F.C. (2019)
 Gerson Vieira – Mumbai City FC (2016–2018), ATK (2018–2019)
 Gustavo Marmentini – Delhi Dynamos FC (2014–2015)
 Gustavo Silva Conceição – Mohun Bagan A.C. (2015)
 Pedro Gusmao – Kerala Blasters FC (2014)
 André Moritz – Mumbai City FC (2014–2015)
 Guilherme Batata – Northeast United FC (2014) Gokulam Kerala FC (2018–2019)
 Elinton Andrade – FC Goa (2015)
 Reinaldo Cruz Oliveira – FC Goa (2015–2016)
 Lúcio – FC Goa (2015–2016)
 Jacson – Langsning F.C. (2019–2020)
 Lucas Luiz Scalon – Chennai City F.C. (2017–2018)
 Marcos Thank – Chennai City F.C. (2017–2018)
 Robert William De Souza Ribeiro – Ozone F.C. (2017–2018) Minerva Punjab F.C. (2018–2019)
 Fábio Cortez Vidal – Mohun Bagan A.C. (2004–2005)
 Robinho – Mumbai F.C. (2016–2017)
 Bruno Bryan – Fateh Hyderabad A.F.C (2016–2017)
 Cristiano de Lima – Dempo S.C. (2003–2004) East Bengal FC (2002–2003)
 Vitinho – Vasco S.C. (2005–2006)
 João Victor – Chennaiyin FC (2020–present)
 Marcos Alexandro Pereira – Vasco S.C. (2001–2002) Mohun Bagan A.C. (2002–2003) (2009–2010) Churchill Brothers S.C. (2004–2005) JCT F.C. (2005–2006) Salgaocar S.C. (2003–2004)
 Daniel Jorge – East Bengal F.C. (2006–2007)
 Erwin Spitzner – Kerala Blasters FC (2014)
 Luis Carlos Santos – Fateh Hyderabad A.F.C. (2016–2017)
 Nacimento Silveira – Dempo S.C. (2008–2009) Churchill Brothers S.C. (2009–2010) United S.C.  (2010–2011)
 Alexandro da Silva Santos – East Bengal F.C. (2010–2011)
 Preto – East Bengal F.C. (1997–1998)
 Thiago Ferreira da Costa – East Bengal F.C. (2006–2007)
 Marcio Fernandes Tomaz – East Bengal F.C. (2006–2007)
 Luiz Octavio Alvez de Souza – East Bengal F.C. (2006–2007)
 Juliano Martins – East Bengal F.C. (2004–2005)
 Paolo Da Silva – East Bengal F.C. (2004–2005)
 Daniel Jorge – East Bengal F.C. (2006–2007)
 Edson K. Wanderley – Vasco S.C. (1999–2000)
 Flavio Lopez – Mohun Bagan A.C. (2000–2001)
 Robson Santana – Mumbai FC (2016–2017) 
 Marcos Rogerio Secco – Fransa-Pax FC (2003–2004) East Bengal F.C. (2004–2005)
 Emerson Silva – Fransa-Pax FC (2003–2004)
 Eduardo Chacon Coelho Lacerda – Prayag United S.C. (2009–2010) Air India F.C. (2010) Southern Samity (2011–2012)
 Fábio Cortez Vidal – Churchill Brothers S.C. (2008–2009)
 Eduardo da Silva Escobar – JCT FC (2007–2009)
 Rogerio R.D. Solio – Vasco SC (1999–2000)
 Itauê Oliveira Rosa – New Delhi Heroes (2008–2009)
 Ivan Fiel da Silva – Fransa-Pax FC (2005–2008) Salgaocar S.C. (2008–2009)
 Jefferson Rocha – Vasco SC (2008–2009)
 Paulo Victor Soares – NEROCA FC (2020)
 Rui Wanderlei Weis – Vasco SC (2000–2001)
 Wellington – NorthEast United (2017)
 Wellington de Lima Gomes – NorthEast United (2016)
 Wellington Priori – NorthEast United (2016) Jamshedpur FC (2018–2019; 2022–present)
 Helder Lobato Ribeiro – TRAU FC (2020–2022)
 Carvalho Pereira – JCT Mills F.C. (2007–2008)
 Braulio Nóbrega – Bengaluru F.C. (2017–2018)
 Romario Alves – FC Kerala (2020–2021)
 Felipe Almeida De Souza – NEROCA FC (2020)
 Wagner De Carmo – NEROCA FC (2020)
 Matheus Souza Silva – Lonestar Kashmir FC (2020–2021)
 João Victor – Hyderabad FC (2020–present)
 Eliel da Cruz Guardiano – AU Rajasthan FC (2020–2021)
 Marques Marcio de Oliveira – ARA FC (2020–2021)
 Luiz Eduardo – Bhawanipore FC (2020)
 Robsõn Dos Säntos – Salgaocar S.C. (1996–1997)
 Dênis Oliveira Araujo – Bhawanipore FC (2020–2021)
 Pedro Gusmão – Kerala Blasters FC (2014)
 Bruno Volante Rodriguéz – TRAU F.C. (2021–2022)
 Ednei Jose Damasio – Mahindra United FC (2004–2005)
 Jacson Glei Da Silva – Langsning F.C. (2017–2018)
 Joao Dos Santos – Salgaocar SC (1999–2000)
 Matheus Cambuci – Churchill Brothers SC (2018–2019)
 Bruno Ramires – Bengaluru FC (2021–present)
 Ygor Catatau – Mumbai City FC (2021–2022)
 Thales Lima – TRAU FC (2021–2022)
 Cássio Gabriel – Mumbai City FC (2021–2022)
 Jonathas de Jesus – Odisha FC (2021–2022)
 Guilherme Escuro – Churchill Brothers FC (2021–2022)
 Tiago Adan Fonseca – Real Kashmir FC (2021–present)
 Douglas Santana – TRAU FC (2021–present)
 Fabiano Donato Alves – Rajasthan United FC (2021–2022)
 Fernando Gomes Júnior – TRAU FC (2021–2022)
 Marcelo Ribeiro Dos Santos – SC East Bengal (2022)
 Victor Rodrigues Santana – Kerala United FC (2022–present)
 Wesley Alex Maiolino – Muthoot FA (2022)
 Eliandro dos Santos Gonzaga – East Bengal Club (2022–present)
 Everton Ferreira Guimarães – Gokulam Kerala FC (2022–present)

Burkina Faso

 Bakary Koné – Kerala Blasters FC (2020–2021)
 Saïdou Panandétiguiri – FC Pune City (2014)
 Christian Ouedraogo – Golden Threads FC (2023–present)

Cape Verde
 Valmiro Lopes Rocha – Atlético de Kolkata (2015)
 Odaïr Fortes – NorthEast United FC (2017)

Cameroon
 Achille Emaná – Mumbai City FC (2017–2018)
 André Bikey – NorthEast United FC (2015) FC Pune City (2016) Jamshedpur FC (2017–2018) ATK (2018–2019)
 Maxwell Ellon – Lonestar Kashmir F.C. (2019–2020)
 Aser Pierrick Dipanda – DSK Shivajians F.C. (2016) Shillong Lajong F.C. (2017) Mohun Bagan A.C. (2017–2019) Punjab F.C. (2019–2020) Real Kashmir FC (2020–2021) Aizawl FC (2021–present)
 Bong Tequwa Bertrand – Sporting Clube de Goa (2012–2013)
 Ernest Emako-Siankam – Churchill Brothers S.C. (2010)
 Calvin Mbarga – Salgaocar S.C. (2015–2016)
 Ngassa Ewane Guy Martial – East Bengal FC (2006–2007)
 Francis Ambané – Gokulam Kerala FC (2017–2018)
 Mike Djougo Foku – FC Kerala (2017–2018) Tarun Sangha Club (2020–2021) Hyderya Sports FC (2021)
 Pierre Boya – Mohun Bagan A.C. (2014–2015)
 Andre Thierry Biyikbiyik – Gangtok Himalayan SC (2016–2017)
 Raphaël Messi Bouli – Kerala Blasters FC (2019–2020)
 Eric Djemba-Djemba – Chennaiyin FC (2014)
 Ndem guy harvey – East Bengal F.C. (2005–2006) Mohammedan Sporting Club (2007–2008)
 Charles Edoa Nga – Shillong Lajong F.C. (2013)
 Jean Njoh – Air India F.C. (2007–2008)
 Bashiree Abbas – Air India F.C. (2003–2009) Mumbai F.C. (2009–2010)
 Aminou Bouba – Gokulam Kerala FC (2021–present)
 Christopher MacDonald – Shaheen FC (2021–2022)
 Rayden Gonzo – Eastern Railway FC (2021–2022)
 Zacharie Mbenda – Kenkre FC (2021–present)
 Romaric Bettat – Peerless SC (2021–present)
 Jacque Essombe – BASCO FC (2021–present)
 George Forbia – Don Bosco FA (2021–present)
 Guy Herman Atimele – SAT Tirur (2021–present)
 Banana Yaya – Bengaluru FC (2022–present)
 Auguste Somlaga – Gokulam Kerala FC (2022–present)

Canada
 Iain Hume – Kerala Blasters FC (2014), Atlético de Kolkata (2015–2016) Kerala Blasters FC (2017–2018) FC Pune City (2018–2019)
 Imone Mohanta – Churchill Brothers SC (2009–2010)
 Tony Menezes – Mahindra United FC (2006–2007)

Chad
 Azrack-Yassine Mahamat – Kerala Blasters FC (2016)
 Jules Aliba – Salgaocar S.C. (2003–2004)

Congo
 Edson Dico Minga – Mahindra United FC (2007)
 Kapongo Ilunga Patient – Indian Bank Recreational Club (2017–2019)
 Prince Vinny Ibara – Bengaluru FC (2021–present)
 Thievy Bifouma – NorthEast United FC (2022)
 Dua Stanislas Ankira  – Sreenidi Deccan FC (2023–present)
 Kule Mbombo – NorthEast United FC (2023–present)

Congo DR
 Arnold Issoko – Mumbai City FC (2018–2019)
 Jacques Maghoma – S.C. East Bengal (2020–2021)
 Lelo Mbele – Gokulam Kerala FC (2017)
 Liswa Nduti – East Bengal F.C. (2005–2006)
 Siyo Zunapio – Churchill Brothers S.C. (2017–2018)

Colombia
 Andres Gonzalez – FC Pune City (2014)
 Jairo Suárez – Chennaiyin FC (2014)
 Janeiler Rivas Palacios – NorthEast United FC (2019)
 John Mosquera – NorthEast United FC (2018)
 Jorge Caceido Rodriguez – Minerva Punjab FC (2018–2019)
 José David Leudo – NorthEast United FC (2018–2020)
 Luis Yanes – NorthEast United FC (2014)
 Omar Andrés Rodríguez – FC Pune City (2014)
 Stiven Mendoza – Chennaiyin F.C. (2014)(2015)
 Luis Alfonso Páez – North East United FC (2017–2018)
 Juan David Castañeda – Sreenidi Deccan FC (2021–present)
 Wilmar Jordán Gil – NorthEast United FC (2022–present)

Costa Rica
 Carlos Hernández – Prayag United SC (2013–2014) Dempo S.C. (2015)
 Cristian Lagos – Churchill Brothers S.C. (2014)
 Jhonny Acosta – East Bengal F.C. (2018–2019) (2019–2020)
 Michael Rodríguez – United Sikkim FC (2012–2013)
 Yendrick Ruiz – FC Pune City (2015)

Croatia
 Damir Grgić – FC Pune City (2017–2018)
 Mislav Komorski – Northeast United FC (2018–2019)
 Mato Grgić – Northeast United FC (2018–2019), Mumbai City FC (2019–2020)
 Anto Pejić – Pathachakra FC (2018)
 Franjo Prce – SC East Bengal (2021–2022)
 Marko Lešković – Kerala Blasters FC (2021–present)
 Antonio Perošević – SC East Bengal (2021–2022)
 Petar Slišković – Chennaiyin FC (2022–present)

Curaçao
 Guyon Fernandez – Delhi Dynamos FC (2017–2018)

Cyprus
 Charalambos Kyriakou – East Bengal Club (2022–present)

Czech Republic
 Jakub Podaný – Atlético de Kolkata (2014)
 Pavel Eliáš – Delhi Dynamos FC (2014)
 Marek Čech – Delhi Dynamos FC (2014)
 Jan Šeda – FC Goa (2014)
 Miroslav Slepička – FC Goa (2014)
 Pavel Čmovš – Mumbai City FC (2014–2015)
 Tomáš Josl – NorthEast United FC (2014)
 Štrandel Petr – Mahindra United FC (2002–2003)
 Jan Štohanzl – Mumbai City FC (2014)

Denmark
 Morten Skoubo – Delhi Dynamos FC (2014)
 Mads Junker – Delhi Dynamos FC (2014)
 Simon Azoulay Pedersen – Viva Kerala FC (2011)
 Michael Jakobsen – NorthEast United FC (2022–present)

Dominica
 Chad Bertrand – Sporting Clube De Goa (2010–2011)
 Kurlson Benjamin – Chirag United Kerala FC (2011–2012)

Egypt
 Abdelhamid Shabana – Churchill Brothers S.C. (2013–2014)
 Fady Armanious – Sporting Clube De Goa (2018–2019)
 Omar Elhussieny – Mohun Bagan A.C. (2018–2019)
 Uzor Martin – Dempo S.C. (1998–2000)

England
 Adam Le Fondre – Mumbai City FC (2020–2021)
 Adil Nabi – Delhi Dynamos FC (2015)
 Bobby Hassell – Kalyani Bharat FC (2014–2015)
 Calum Angus – Pune FC (2013–2014) Dempo SC (2014–15) East Bengal F.C. (2016)
 Carl Baker – Atlético de Kolkata (2017)
 Chris Dagnall – Kerala Blasters FC (2015)
 David James – Kerala Blasters FC (2014)
 Gary Hooper – Kerala Blasters FC (2020–2021)
 Neil Edmonds – East Bengal F.C. (1991–1992)
 Adam Mitter – Fateh Hyderabad A.F.C. (2016–2017) Real Kashmir F.C. (2020)
 Conor Thomas – Atlético de Kolkata (2017–2018)
 Danny Seaborne – Mohun Bagan A.C. (2016)
 James Bailey – FC Pune City (2015)
 Jay Hart – Minerva Punjab F.C. (2019–2020)
 John Johnson – Bengaluru FC (2013–2018) ATK (2018–2020) ATK Mohun Bagan FC (2020) RoundGlass Punjab (2021)
 Josh Walker – Bengaluru FC (2014–2016)
 Kallum Higginbotham – Real Kashmir FC (2019–2020)
 Marcus Willams – Kerala Blasters FC (2015)
 Nicky Shorey – FC Pune City (2015)
 Paul Rachubka – Kerala Blasters FC (2017–2018)
 Peter Ramage – Kerala Blasters FC (2015)
 Roger Johnson – FC Pune City (2015)
 Rohan Ricketts – Dempo SC (2012)
 Ryan Taylor – Atlético de Kolkata  (2017–2018)
 Sanchez Watt – Kerala Blasters FC (2015)
 Stephen Bywater – Kerala Blasters FC (2015)
 Steve Simonsen – FC Pune City (2015)
 Steven Alan Prindiville – East Bengal F.C. (1990–1991)
 Tom Thorpe – Atlético de Kolkata (2017–2018)
 Michael Chopra – Kerala Blasters FC (2014) (2016)
 James Keene – Northeast United FC (2014)
 Wes Brown – Kerala Blasters FC (2017–2018)
 Matt Mills – FC Pune City (2018–2019)
 Raman Patrick Sisupalan – Viva Kerala FC (2009–2010)
 Peter Hartley – Jamshedpur FC (2020–present)
 Steven Taylor – Odisha FC (2020–2021)
 Calum Woods – S.C. East Bengal (2020–2021)
 Josef Yarney – RoundGlass Punjab FC (2021–present)
 Jay Emmanuel-Thomas – Jamshedpur FC (2022–present)
 Matt Derbyshire – NorthEast United FC (2022–present)
 Jake Jervis – East Bengal FC (2023–present)

Equatorial Guinea
 Ivan Bolado – FC Pune City (2014)
 Lawrence Doe – Shillong Lajong F.C. (2017–2018)
 Raúl Fabiani – Pune F.C. (2013)
 Eduardo Ferreira – FC Pune City (2016), Mohun Bagan (2017–2018), East Bengal F.C. (2018), NEROCA F.C. (2018–2019)

Ethiopia
 Fikru Tefera – Atlético de Kolkata (2014) Chennaiyin FC (2015) Mohammedan Sporting Club (2016)

Fiji
 Gurjeet Singh – Fateh Hyderabad AFC (2016–2017)
 Roy Krishna – ATK (2019–2020) ATK Mohun Bagan FC (2020–2022) Bengaluru FC (2022–present)

Finland
 Joni Kauko – ATK Mohun Bagan FC (2021–present)
 Jussi Jääskeläinen – Atlético de Kolkata (2017–2018)
 Njazi Kuqi – Atlético de Kolkata (2017–2018)

France
 Bernard Mendy – Chennaiyin FC (2014–2015), East Bengal F.C. (2016), Chennaiyin FC (2016)
 Cedric Hengbart – Kerala Blasters F.C. (2014) Northeast United FC (2015) Kerala Blasters F.C. (2016)
 Claude Gnakpa – Salgaocar SC (2013)
 Christophe Jonette – TRAU F.C. (2017–2018)
 David Trezeguet – FC Pune City (2014)
 Florent Malouda – Delhi Dynamos FC (2015)
 Gennaro Bracigliano – Chennaiyin FC (2014) NorthEast United FC (2015)
 Jean-Michel Joachim – Chennai City F.C. (2017–2018) NEROCA F.C. (2018)
 Jérémy Labor – DSK Shivajians F.C. (2016)
 Johan Letzelter – Mumbai City FC (2014)
 Maxime Belouet – Salgaocar SC (2012–2013)
 Mikael Silvestre – Chennaiyin FC (2014)
 Nicolas Anelka – Mumbai City FC (2014–2015)
 Raphaël Romey – Kerala Blasters FC (2014)
 Alexandre Tabillon – Mohammedan S.C. (2015–2016) Lonestar Kashmir F.C. (2016–2017)
 Robert Pires – FC Goa (2014)
 Youness Bengelloun – FC Goa (2014)
 Philippe De Azevedo – Mahindra United FC (2006–2007)
 Eric Obinna Chukwunyelu – Churchill Brothers SC (2017–2018)
 Sylvain Monsoreau – Atletico de Kolkata (2014)
 Romain Philippoteaux – NorthEast United FC (2022–present)

Gabon
 Henri Antchouet – Churchill Brothers S.C. (2011–2013)
 Sèrge Kevyn Aboué – Mumbai City FC (2019–2020)
 Yrondu Musavu-King – Bengaluru FC (2021–2022)

Gambia
 Alpha Jallow – Prayag United S.C. (2016–2017)
 Dawda Ceesay – Churchill Brothers SC (2017–2019) Mohun Bagan A.C. (2019) Minerva Punjab F.C. (2019) Churchill Brothers SC (2019–2020) Minerva Delhi FC (2021–present)
 Saihou Jagne – Fateh Hyderabad A.F.C (2017) Shillong Lajong F.C. (2017–2018)
 Sainey Bojang – Fateh Hyderabad A.F.C (2018–2019)
 Nuha Marong Krubally – Rajasthan United FC (2022–2023)

Germany
 Manuel Friedrich – Mumbai City FC (2014)
 Ville Matti Steinmann – SC East Bengal (2020–2021)
 Julius Düker – Chennaiyin FC (2022–present)

Ghana
 Abednego Tetteh – Real Kashmir FC (2018–2019) TRAU FC (2019–2020)
 Augustine Okrah – Northeast United FC (2018)
 Asamoah Gyan – NorthEast United FC (2019–2020)
 Abu Iddrisu – East Bengal F.C. (1999–2000)
 Abel Hammond – Mumbai FC (2008–2009) East Bengal FC (2009–2010)
 Abu Siddiqui – FC Kochin (1999–2000) 
 Kwesi Appiah – Northeast United FC (2020–2021)
 Siva Mumuni – East Bengal F.C. (2000–2001)
 Emmanuel Opoku – East Bengal F.C. (1999–2000)
 Charles Dzisah – Viva Kerala FC (2009–2011) Chirag United Kerala (2011–2012) Mohammedan S.C. (2012–2013) Kalighat Milan Sangha F.C. (2013–14)
 Charles Asamoah – Mahindra United F.C. (2004–2005)
 Baafi Jackson Kwabena – Chennai City F.C. (2017)
 Cristian Sabah – Gokulam Kerala FC (2018–2019)
 Courage Pekuson – Kerala Blasters FC (2017–2019)
 Daniel Ashley Addo – Gokulam Kerala F.C. (2017–2019)
 Arafat Haruna – Hindustan F.C. (2019–2020)
 Edmond Peprah – Fateh Hyderabad AFC (2017–2018) Peerless SC (2018–2020)
 Oscar Ahinampong – Hindustan F.C. (2020–present)
 Samuel Kane – Mohammedan S.C. (2015–2016)
 Forster Addae – Fateh Hyderabad F.C. (2018–2020)
 David Addy – Delhi Dynamos FC (2016–2017)
 David Adjei – Mahindra United FC (2006–2008)
 Jackson Egypong – East Bengal F.C. (1998–1999)
 Kennedy Ofosuhene Amponsah – East Bengal F.C. (1999–2000)
 Felix Aboagye – Mahindra United (2003–2004) East Bengal FC (2004–2005) Mumbai FC (2007–2009)
 Francis Dadzie – NorthEast United FC (2015) Sporting Clube de Goa (2016) Aizawl FC (2018)
 John Ampong – Calcutta Customs (2018–2019)
 Ishmael Addo – East Bengal FC (2008–2009)
 Collin Patterson – AU Rajasthan F.C.(2019–2020)
 James Dissiramah – Mumbai F.C. (2007–2009)
 Joseph Adjei – Aizawl F.C. (2019–2020)
 Lawrence Adjei – Sporting Clube de Goa (2008)
 Kalif Alhassan – Minerva Punjab F.C. (2019) Churchill Brothers S.C. (2019–2020)
 Adolf McCarthy – Churchill Brothers S.C. (2003–2004)
 Richard Gadze – Delhi Dynamos FC (2015–2016)
 Suley Musah – East Bengal F.C. (1997–2004, 2008–2009)
 William Opoku – Minerva Punjab FC (2017–2019) 
 Yaw Amankwah Mireku – Viva Kerala FC (2007–2008)
 Yusif Yakubu – Churchill Brothers S.C. (1999–2003) Mahindra United (2004–2008) East Bengal F.C. (2008–2010) Salgaocar (2010–2011) Prayag United SC (2011–2012) Mumbai FC (2012–2014) Mohammedan S.C. (2016) Churchill Brothers S.C. (2017)
 Bashiree Mohammed Abbas – Air India F.C. (2007–2008)
 Bright Middleton Mends – Pathachakra FC (2018–2019) BSS Sporting Club (2019) Quartz F.C. (2019–2020)
 Stephen Ofei – Dempo S.C. (2012) Vasco S.C. (2013–2014)
 Abel Hammond – Mumbai F.C. (2008–2009) East Bengal F.C. (2009–2010)
 Godwin Quashiga – Fateh Hyderabad A.F.C. (2017–2018) Rainbow A.C. (2018–2019) Chhinga Veng F.C. (2019–2020)
 Samed Abdul Awudu – East Bengal F.C. (2007–2008)
 Evans Quao – Mumbai F.C. (2009–2013)
 Santa Cruz – FC Thrissur (2017–2018)
 Isaac Boakye – Chirag United Kerala F.C. (2011–2012)
 Andrew Michael Ogwuche – Golden Threads F.C. (2017–2018)
 Andrews Pomeyie Mensah – Mahindra United (2006–2008)
 Philip Mensah – Churchill Brothers S.C. (1998–1999)
 Reuben Senyo – Viva Kerala FC (2009–2010)
 Alfred Nil Larbi Darku – Viva Kerala FC (2007–2008)
 Mohamed Awal – Gokulam Kerala FC (2020–2021) Sreenidi Deccan FC (2021–present)
 Osmani Hussein – Churchill Brothers S.C. (1998–2000)
 Mohammed Fatau – Mohammedan S.C. (2020–2021)
 Abbey Wisdom – Viva Kerala FC (2007–2008)
 Dennis Antwi – Gokulam Kerala F.C. (2020–present)
 Michael George Osei – Mumbai FC (2008–2009)
 Richard Mensah – FC Bardez (2016–2018)
 Nana David – FC Kochin (2001–2002)
 Philip Adjah Tettah – Mohammedan S.C. (2018–2019) Calcutta Customs (2019) NEROCA F.C. (2019–2020) Bhawanipore F.C. (2020) Mohammedan S.C. (2020–present)
 Moses Zutah – Mohammedan S.C. (2018–2019)
 Odartey Lawson – Mahindra United FC (2003–2004)
 Charles Teiko Folley – Gokulam Kerala FC (2019–2020)
 John Ampong – Pride Sports FC (2017–2018) Calcutta Customs (2018–2019) NBP Rainbow A.C. (2019–2020)
 Willie Brown – East Bengal F.C. (1999–2000)
 Stephen Abeiku – Gokulam Kerala FC B (2018–2019) Kerala United FC (2021–present)
 Halifex Afrane – FC Kochin (2002–2003)
 Daniel Bomfa – FC Kochin (2002–2003)
 Sadat Bukari – Churchill Brothers FC (2018–2019)
 Musha Bambatelli – Guardian Angel FC (2019–2020)
 Rahim Osumanu – Gokulam Kerala FC (2021–present)
 Kwesi Sessy – Downtown Heroes FC (2021–present)
 Ben Nash Quansah – Railway FC (2021) NEROCA FC (2021–present)
 Stephan Abeiku Acquah – Parappur FC (2021–present)
 Joseph Tetteh – Golden Threads FC (2021–present)
 Obeng Kojo Forson	– Real Malabar FC (2021–present)
 Bismarck Sersah – Real Malabar FC (2021–present)
 Kumi Emmanuel – Real Malabar FC (2021–present)
 Albert Omari – Techtro Swades United FC (2022–present)
 Kwame Karikari – Chennaiyin FC (2022–present)
 Nana Poku – TRAU FC (2022–present)
 Charles Offei Quarcoo – Hindustan FC (2022–present)
 Moro Lamine – Real Kashmir FC (2022–present)
 Seidu Issahak – Real Kashmir FC (2022–present)
 Ibrahim Nurudeen – Real Kashmir FC (2022–present)

Greece
 Alexandros Tzorvas – Northeast United FC (2014)
 Panagiotis Triadis – NorthEast United FC (2019–2020)
 Ilias Pollalis – Mumbai City FC (2014)
 Kostas Katsouranis – FC Pune City (2014)
 Apostolos Giannou – Kerala Blasters FC (2022–present)
 Dimitrios Diamantakos – Kerala Blasters FC (2022–present)

Grenada
 Antonio German – Kerala Blasters FC (2015–2017) Gokulam Kerala F.C. (2018–2019)
 Marcus Julien – North Imphal Sporting Association (2011–2012)

Guam
 John Matkin – United Sikkim FC (2012–2013)
 Marcus Lopez – Minerva Punjab F.C. (2016)

Guinea
 Florentin Pogba – ATK Mohun Bagan (2022–present)
 Abdoul Karim Sylla – F.C. Kerala (2017–2018)
 Aboubacar Camara Bakia – ARA F.C. (2020–present)
 Boubacar Keita – Sporting Clube de Goa (2011–2013) Salgaocar F.C. (2016) Kenkre FC (2016–2018)
 Mandjou Keita – Salgaocar F.C. (2009–2010) Pune F.C. (2010–2012)
 Mansa Sylla – Viva Kerala FC (2008–2011)
 Sylla Karim Sulaiman – Cochin Port Trust (2016–2017)
 Souleymane Sylla – PIFA F.C. (2018–2019)
 Idrissa Sylla – NorthEast United FC (2020–present)
 Sekou Sylla – Churchill Brothers FC (2020–present)
 Sanoh Louceny Pato – Parappur FC (2021–2022)

Guinea-Bissau
 Mamadu Samba Candé – Northeast United FC (2017–2018)
 Esmaël Gonçalves – Chennaiyin FC (2020–2021)

Haiti
 Wedson Anselme – East Bengal F.C. (2016)
 Kervens Belfort – Kerala Blasters FC (2016) Jamshedpur FC (2017–2018)
 Frantz Bertin – Mumbai City FC (2015)
 Peterson Joseph – Sudeva Moonlight F.C. (2017)
 Jean Eudes Maurice – Chennaiyin FC (2014)
 Duckens Nazon – Kerala Blasters FC (2016)
 Sony Norde – Mohun Bagan A.C. (2014–2019) Mumbai City FC (2015–2016) 
 Judelin Aveska – Mohun Bagan A.C. (2015)
 Fabien Vorbe – NEROCA F.C. (2017–2018)

Honduras
 Roby Norales – Bengaluru FC (2017) Ozone FC (2017)
 Georgie Welcome – Mohun Bagan A.C. (2015)
 Clayvin Zúñiga – Churchill Brothers SC (2020–2021)

Hong Kong 
 Ruk Bahadur – East Bengal FC (1975–1976)
 Colly Barnes Ezeh – Mohun Bagan A.C. (2000–2001)
 Eze Isiocha 伊薩 – Sporting Clube de Goa (2007)

Hungary
 Attila Busai – NEROCA FC (2020)
 Krisztián Vadócz – FC Pune City (2014) Mumbai City FC (2016)
 Vladimir Koman Jr. – Chennaiyin FC (2021–2022)

Iceland
 Eiður Guðjohnsen – FC Pune City (2016–2017)
 Guðjón Baldvinsson – Kerala Blasters FC (2018)

Indonesia
 Beto Gonçalves – Dempo S.C. (2010)
 Muhammad Iqbal – Athletic Union Rajasthan (2019–2021)
 Gbeneme Friday – Mumbai FC (2011–2012) Shillong Lajong FC (2012–2013)

Italy
 Alessandro Nesta – Chennaiyin FC (2014)
 Emanuele Belardi – FC Pune City (2014)
 Manuele Blasi – Chennaiyin FC (2015–2016)
 Bruno Cirillo – FC Pune City (2014)
 Davide Colomba – FC Pune City (2014)
 Alessandro Del Piero – Delhi Dynamos FC (2014)
 Francesco Franzese – Chennaiyin FC (2014)
 Daniele Magliocchetti – FC Pune City (2014)
 Marco Materazzi – Chennaiyin FC (2014)
 Mauro Boerchio – NEROCA F.C. (2018–2019), Chennai City F.C. (2019)
 Gilmar Silva Da Gonzalvez – East Bengal F.C. (2002–2003)
 Maurizio Peluso – Chennaiyin FC (2016)
 Alessandro Potenza – Chennaiyin FC (2015)
 Davide Succi – Chennaiyin FC (2016)
 Stefano Monteleon – Delhi Dynamos FC (2015)
 Mario Ferri Falco – United SC (2022)

Iran
 Ahmad Sanjari – Mohammedan Sporting (1978)
 Mahmood Khabaji – East Bengal FC (1980–1981)
 Majid Bishkar – East Bengal FC (1979–1981) Mohammedan Sporting (1982–1987)
 Jamshid Nassiri – East Bengal F.C. (1980–1981) Mohammedan Sporting (1982–1985)
 Gholam Ali – East Bengal FC (1985–1986)
 Davood Hosseini – Mahindra United FC (2000–2001)
 Edison Joseph – Southern Samity (2015–2016) 
 Gholam Reza – Mahindra United FC (2000–2001)
 Behnam Mohammed Reza – Air India FC (2009–2010)
 Rouhollah Samieinia – Salgaocar FC (2009–2010) Churchill Brothers SC (2010) Dempo S.C. (2011)
 Sayed Amin Mousavi – Churchill Brothers SC (2000–2001)
 Samad Naorojian – East Bengal FC (1986–1987)
 Iman Basafa – Bengaluru FC (2021–2022)
 Kamal Sayeed Ahamadi – Dempo SC (1999–2000)
 Assad Sultan – Dempo SC (1999–2000)
 Behzad Amri – Dempo S.C. (1999–2000)
 Omid Singh – East Bengal FC (2020)
 Mohammed Reza Ebrahim – Dempo S.C. (1999–2000)
 Mohammad Sanjari – Mohammedan Sporting (2009–2010)
 Vafa Hakhamaneshi – Chennaiyin FC (2022–present)
 Milad Pakparvar – Churchill Brothers FC (2022)

Iraq
 Bassim Yonan – Churchill Brothers S.C. (1998–1999) Mohun Bagan A.C. (1999–2000)
 Hameed R. Atia – Indian Telephone Industries Limited (2000–2001)
 Majeed Odaa – Mohammedan Sporting Club (1999–2000) Indian Telephone Industries Limited (2000–2001)
 Majid Al-Nima – Dempo S.C. (1999–2000)
 Mohammed Jabbar – Mohammedan Sporting Club (1999–2000)
 Sameer Abbas – Mohammedan Sporting Club (1999–2000)

Ivory Coast
 Alexander Kouame – Minerva Punjab F.C. (2018) Kalighat Milan Sangha (2019–2020)
 Arthur Kouassi – Gokulam Kerala FC (2018) Mohammedan S.C. (2019) Bhawanipore F.C. (2019)
 Abdoulaye Koffi – Shillong Lajong FC (2017–2018)
 Bazie Armand – East Bengal FC (2017–2018) Minerva Punjab FC (2018) Mohammedan S.C. (2018) Real Kashmir F.C. (2018–2020) Churchill Brothers S.C. (2020–2021) Aizawl FC (2021–present)
 Bema Coulibaly – Vasco S.C. (2017–2019) Lonestar Kashmir F.C. (2019–2020) Rangers SC Delhi (2021–present)
 Boubacar Sanogo – NorthEast United FC (2015)
 Bernard Yao Kouassi – Kenkre F.C. (2016–2017) Real Kashmir F.C. (2017–2018)
 Didier Kadio – Kerala Blasters F.C. (2016)
 Didier Zokora – FC Pune City (2015) NorthEast United FC (2016)
 Eric Dagroh – Salgaocar S.C. (2009–2010)
 Gnohere Krizo – Real Kashmir FC (2018–2020) Churchill Brothers FC (2022–present)
 Edjique Landry – Controllerate of Inspection Electronics (2016–2018)
 Guy Eric Dano – Minerva Punjab FC (2017–2018) NBP Rainbow AC (2018–2019)
 Mechac Koffi – Churchill Brothers S.C. (2018–2019)
 Kouame Konan Zacharie – Delhi United S.C. (2017–2018) Minerva Punjab FC (2018–2019)
 Ladji Saika Sylla – Delhi United S.C. (2019–2020)
 Romaric Ndri – NorthEast United FC (2016–2017)
 Ouattara Sie – FC Kerala (2017–2018) RFC Kochi (2018–2019) Chhinga Veng FC (2019–2020) Golden Threads FC (2021–2022) 
 Gatch Arthure Diomande – Mohammedan Sporting (2011–2012) Aryan F.C. (2019–2020)
 Douhou Pierre – Mahindra United FC (2007–2009) Pune FC (2009–2014) Salgaocar FC (2015) DSK Shivajians FC (2016)
 Seidu Made – Aryan FC (2019–2020)
 Cyrille Brohiri – FC Kerala (2018–2019)
 Cheick Hamza Bamba – Hindustan FC (2017–2018) Sudeva Moonlight FC (2018–2019)
 Kamo Stéphane Bayi – George Telegraph S.C. (2016) Salgaocar S.C. (2016) Aizawl FC (2017) Mohun Bagan A.C. (2017) Gokulam Kerala F.C. (2017–2018) Tollygunge Agragami (2018) Bhawanipore F.C. (2019–2020)
 Kone Rooney Yusuf – RFC Kochi (2018–2019)
 Léonce Zikahi Dodoz – Gangtok Himalayan SC (2015–2016) Mohammedan Sporting (2016–2017) Chanmari FC (2016) Aizawl FC (2017–2019) Bhawanipore FC (2019–2020)
 Lorougnon Christ Remi – Churchill Brothers SC (2019–2020)
 Lago Dagbo Bei – Minerva Punjab FC (2017–2018)
 Lancine Touré – Mohammedan Sporting (2015–2017) Lonestar Kashmir FC (2017) Langsning SC (2017–2018) Mohammedan Sporting (2018) Minerva Punjab FC (2018–2019)
 Lassine Karamoko – Kenkre FC (2015–2016) Kalighat Milan Sangha (2019–2020)
 Moussa Ballo Finigue – Kalighat Milan Sangha (2013–2015)
 Monga Aby Samson – Mahindra United FC (2002–2004)
 Karamoko Usman – Sporting Clube De Goa (2018) Velsao SCC (2019–2020)
 Kouamé Kossonõu Junior – Vasco SC (2018–2019) Calangute Association FC (2020–2021)
 Dechanel Gnoanrou	– Hyderya Sports FC (2021–2022)
 Seydou Kourouma – BSS Sporting Club (2021–2022)
 Bertie Bridji Anderson – Kochi City FC (2021–2022)
 Alassane Junior Sagara – Kochi City FC (2021–2022)
 Vakaba Kourouma – Wayanad United FC (2021–2022)
 Kilane Ebenezer Diamande – Kochi City FC (2021–2022)
 Yannick Boli – NorthEast United (2022–present)

Jamaica
 Deshorn Brown – Bengaluru FC (2020–2021) NorthEast United FC (2021–2022)
 Duwayne Kerr – Chennaiyin FC (2016)
 Giles Barnes – Hyderabad FC (2019–2020)
 Jermaine Pennant – FC Pune City (2014)
 Kevaughn Frater – Bengaluru FC (2020)
 Jourdaine Fletcher – Gokulam Kerala FC (2022–present)

Japan
 Atsushi Yonezawa – Royal Wahingdoh FC (2013–2014) Aizawl F.C. (2015)
 Dan Ito – Churchill Brothers S.C. (2009–2011)
 Daisuke Nishiguchi – Pune FC (2012–2013) DSK Shivajians FC (2013–2014)
 Katsumi Yusa – ONGC F.C. (2011–2013), Mohun Bagan (2013–2017), NorthEast United FC (2016) East Bengal F.C. (2017–2018) NEROCA F.C. (2018–2019), Chennai City F.C. (2019–2020)
 Robert Cullen – NorthEast United FC (2016)
 Ryuji Sueoka – Mohun Bagan AC (2009–2010), Salgaocar SC (2010–2012), Dempo S.C. (2012–2013), East Bengal FC (2013–2014) Pune FC (2014–15)
 Ryuki Kozawa – Mumbai F.C. (2016)
 Seiya Sugishita – Sporting Clube de Goa (2012–2013)
 Shinnosuke Honda – Dempo S.C. (2013)
 Sho Kamimura – Shillong Lajong F.C. (2013)
 Taisuke Matsugae – Shillong Lajong F.C. (2013–2014) Mumbai F.C. (2014–2016)
 Takayuki Omi – Air India FC (2011–2012)
 Taro Hasegawa – Mohammedan Sporting Club (2014–2015)
 Taiki Matsumura – Rangdajied United FC (2012–2013)
 Toshiya Hosoe – Minerva Punjab FC (2017–2018)
 Seiji Saito – Salgaocar S.C. (2013–2014)
 Yohei Iwasaki – Rangdajied United (2013–2014)
 Yugo Kobayashi – Aizawl F.C. (2017–2018)
 Yusuke Kato – Dempo S.C. (2012) 
 Yusuke Yamagata – Shillong Lajong F.C. (2015–2016)
 Yuta Kinowaki – Aizawl F.C. (2015–2016) Shillong Lajong F.C. (2017) Mohun Bagan A.C. (2017–2019)
 Yu Kuboki – Minerva Punjab F.C. (2018)
 Ryoga Katsurashima – Langsning F.C. (2019–2020)
 Katsumasa Nomura – Garhwal F.C. (2019–2020)
 Shingo Nejime – Churchill Brothers S.C. (2013–2014)
 Futa Nakamura – Pathachakra FC (2018–2019)
 Yoshiaki Maruyama – Dempo S.C. (2001)
 Kento Sakurai – Langsning F.C. (2017–2018)
 Reo Nakamura – George Telegraph SC (2017–2018)
 Mitsuki Ichihara – United Sikkim FC (2010–2011)
 Kenji Arai – Sporting Clube De Goa (2009–2010)
 Cy Goddard – Mumbai City FC (2020–2021)
 Taiki Yoshida – Students Union FC (2020–2021)
 Kosuke Yamazaki Uchida – Delhi FC (2022) Sudeva Delhi FC (2022–present)
 Eisuke Mohri – Aizawl FC (2022–present)
 Akito Saito – Aizawl FC (2022–present)

Jersey
 Kurtis Guthrie – RoundGlass Punjab (2021–2022)

Jordan
 Bassam Al-Khatib – Mahindra United F.C. (1999–2000)
 Sameer Ahmed Jamil – Mahindra United F.C. (1999–2000)
 Ra'ed Al-Nawateer – Churchill Brothers S.C. (2013)

Kenya
 Sammy Omollo – East Bengal F.C. (1996–1998) Mohun Bagan A.C. (1998–2001)
 Boniface Ambani – East Bengal F.C. (2006–2007) Sporting Clube de Goa
 Curtis Osano – Bengaluru FC (2013–2016)
 Haggi Azande Abulista – East Bengal F.C. (1997–1998)
 Harrison Muranda – Mohun Bagan A.C. (2013)
 Harold Onyango – Vasco S.C. (2003–2005)
 Julius Owino – East Bengal F.C. (2007–2009)
 Peter Opiyo Odhiambo – Viva Kerala F.C. (2009–2010)
 Zablon Amanaka – East Bengal F.C. (2006–2007)
 Moses Owira – Indian Telephone Industries Limited (1997–1998) Mohammedan Sporting Club (1998–1999) (2001)
 Nicholas Muyoti – Churchill Brothers S.C. (2006 –2007) Sporting Clube De Goa (2007–2008)
 Collins Tiego – George Telegraph S.C. (2016–2017)
 Cassious Akumu Owino – JCT Mills FC (1998–1999) FC Kochin (2001) SAIL Indian Nationals FC (2000–2002)
 William Inganga – Salgaocar S.C. (1999–2000)
 Toni Jose Oniyenga – East Bengal FC (1997–1998)
 Samuel Inawole – Salgaocar S.C. (1997–1998)

Korea DPR
 Kim Seng-yong – Rangdajied United FC (2013–2014) Royal Wahingdoh FC (2015) Bengaluru FC (2015–2016) DSK Shivajians FC (2016–2017)
 Son Min-chol – Shillong Lajong FC (2012–2015) Mumbai FC (2015–2016)

Kosovo
 Liridon Krasniqi – Odisha FC (2021–2022)

Kyrgyzstan
 Akhlidin Israilov – NEROCA FC (2017–2018)
 Aman Talantbekov – Chennai City FC (2017–2018)
 Rustem Usanov – Air India FC (2010)
 Aleksey Drobatov – Indian Telephone Industries Limited (1999–2000)
 Bektur Talgat Uulu – Churchill Brothers SC (2017–2018) Aizawl FC (2018) NEROCA FC (2022–present)
 Ivan Filatov – Minerva Punjab FC (2017)
 Sergey Kalyubin – Indian Telephone Industries Limited (1998–1999)
 Kanatbek Mamatov – HAL SC (2001–2002)
 Ildar Amirov – East Bengal F.C. (2017) Chennai City FC (2017)
 Ruslan Sydykov – HAL SC (2001–2002), (2002–2003)
 Raja Baliev Nurlan – HAL SC (2001–2002)
 Daniel Armah Tagoe – Chennai City FC (2019)
 Daniar – HAL SC (2001–2002)
 Venyamin Shumeyko – Chennai City FC (2017–2018)
 Kiril Keker – Indian Telephone Industries (1999–2001)
 Mirlan Murzaev – Chennaiyin FC (2021–2022) Mohammedan Sporting (2022–present)
 Aydar Mambetaliev – Rajasthan United FC (2022–present)
 Bektur Amangeldiev – Rajasthan United FC (2022–present)
 Atay Dzhumashev – Rajasthan United FC (2023–present)
 Eldar Moldozhunusov – Gokulam Kerala FC (2022–present)

Latvia
 Tomaskov F. Vallery – East Bengal F.C. (1996–1997)
 Sergey Kutov – East Bengal F.C. (1996–1997)

Lebanon
 Akram Moghrabi – Churchill Brothers FC (2012–2013) Mohun Bagan AC (2018)
 Bilal El Najjarine – Churchill Brothers FC (2012–2013)
 Feiz Shamsin – Chennai City FC (2018–2019)
 Hussein El Dor – Churchill Brothers FC (2018–2019)
 Hamza Kheir – Churchill Brothers FC (2020–2021)
 Shadi Skaf – Churchill Brothers FC (2021–2022)
 Mohamad Kdouh – NEROCA FC (2020–2022) FC Bengaluru United (2022–present)
 Youssef Atriss – Rajasthan United FC (2022–present)

Lesotho
 Letšepe Marabe – BASCO FC (2022–present)

Liberia
 Alfred Jaryan – Mohammedan S.C (2010–2013), (2014–2015) Mumbai F.C. (2013–2014) Aizawl F.C. (2015–present) Aryan FC (2021)
 Ansumana Kromah – Churchill Brothers S.C. (2017) Mohun Bagan A.C. (2017) East Bengal F.C. (2018) Peerless SC (2018) Aizawl F.C. (2018–2019) East Bengal F.C. (2020) Bhawanipore FC (2020–present)
 Eric Brown – ONGC F.C. (2012–2013) United Sports Club (2013–2015) Pune FC (2014) Mumbai F.C. (2015–2016) United Sports Club (2017) Pathachakra (2017–2018)
 James Gbilee – Shillong Lajong F.C. (2008–2012) Kalighat Milan Sangha (2012–2014)
 Harry Moris – F.C. Kerala (2018–2019)
 Johnny Menyongar – United Sikkim FC (2011), Shillong Lajong (2011–2013), Dempo (2013), Bengaluru FC (2013–2014)
 Kallon Kiatamba – Chennai City F.C. (2017–2019)
 Pewou Bestman – FC Kochin (2000–2001)
 Sunday Seah – FC Kochin (1999–2001) Salgaocar F.C. (2001–2003) Dempo S.C. (2003–2004)
 Trokon Saykiamien – Hindustan FC (2018–2019)
 Teah Dennis Jr. – Minerva Punjab FC (2019–2020)
 Varney Kallon – Vasco S.C. (2015–2016) NEROCA F.C. (2016–2019) Peerless SC (2019–present)
 Eugene Gray – F.C. Kochin (1999–2001) Salgaocar S.C. (2001–2002) Mohammedan S.C. (2002–2003) United Sports Club (2004)
 Korhena A Boakai – Kenkre F.C. (2016–2017)
 Boima Karpeh – Churchill Brothers S.C. (2011) Pune FC (2013) Sporting Clube de Goa (2013–2015)
 Preston Corporal – Mohammedan S.C. (2006–2007)
 Alex Whittemore – Chanmari F.C. (2017–2018)
 Emile O Damey – Fateh Hyderabad A.F.C. (2018–2019)
 Vasseba Toure – Vasco S.C. (2017–2018)
 Bekay Bewar – Royal Wahingdoh F.C. (2014–2015)
 Joseph Amoah – Sporting Clube De Goa (2012–2013)
 Blamo Adolphus Mutu – RFC Kochi (2018–2019)
 Taurus Tecompleh Manneh – Oil India Limited (2013–2014) Mohammedan S.C. (2014–2015)
 Isaac Tondo – F.C. Kochin (1999–2000)
 Aaron Cole – FC Kochin (2001–2001)
 Glador Oscar Zaire – Salgaocar S.C. (2001–2002)
 Josiah Seton – F.C. Kochin (2001–2002)
 Philip Karnga – F.C. Kochin (2001–2002)
 Raymond Sancho – Salgaocar S.C. (2003–2004)
 Martyn – Indian Telephone Industries Limited (2003–2004)
 Theodore Sunday Wrobeh – Prayag United S.C. (2006–2008) Mohammedan S.C. (2008–2011)
 Philip Tarlue – FC Kochin (2003–2004) HAL SC (2004) J&K Bank Football Club (2004–2005)
 Perry Kollie – Royal Wahingdoh FC (2011–2012)
 Williams Rashidi – FC Kochin (2000–2001)
 Melvin Tarley – DSK Shivajians FC (2013)
 Patrick Nuku Granue – FC Kochin (2000–2002)
 Godwin Abu Baker – Mohammedan S.C. (2003)
 Kelvin Kollie	– Kashmir Avengers FC (2021) Railway FC (2021)
 Benjamin Sackor – Aryan FC (2021)
 Alloy Brown – Calcutta Customs (2021–2022)
 Abubakar Dunnoh – Wayanad United FC (2022–present)
 Alvin Jeh Teah – Parappur FC (2022–present)

Lithuania
 Nerijus Valskis – Chennaiyin FC (2019–2020) Jamshedpur FC (2020–2021) Chennaiyin FC (2021–2022)

Macau
 Gilmar Tadeu da Silva – Mahindra United FC (2001–2002)
 José Maria da Cruz Martins – Vasco SC (1997–1998) Churchill Brothers S.C. (1998–1999)

Malawi
 Young Chimodzi Jr – Kenkre FC (2014–2015)

Malaysia
 Stanley Bernard Samuel – Sporting Clube de Goa (2010–2011)

Maldives
 Ali Ashfaq – Minerva Punjab FC (2019)

Mali
 Abdoulaye Kanouté – Aizawl F.C. (2019–2020)
 Boubacar Diarra – NEROCA F.C. (2019–2020)
 Dramane Traoré – FC Pune City (2016)
 Mohamed Sissoko – FC Pune City (2016)
 Amadou Alou Sissoko – Aizawl F.C. (2019–2020)
 Ousmane Diawara – NEROCA F.C. (2019–2020)
 Ibrahim Sylla – Madhya Bharat S.C. (2018–2020)
 Saliou Guindo – Gokulam Kerala F.C. (2020)
 Minkael Sylla – Bengaluru Young Challengers (2021–2022)

Malta
 André Schembri – Chennaiyin FC (2019–2020)

Martinique
 Grégory Arnolin – FC Goa (2014–2016)
 Frédéric Piquionne – Mumbai City FC (2015)
 Mathias Coureur – NorthEast United FC (2021–2022)
 Sylvain Monsoreau – Atletico de Kolkata (2014–2015)
 Sébastien Carole – NISA Manipur F.C. (2010)

Mauritius
 Sewram Gobin – Mohun Bagan AC (2007–2008) Pune F.C. (2009–2010)

Mauritania
 Khassa Camara – NorthEast United FC (2020–2021) Hyderabad FC (2022–present)

Mexico
 Aníbal Zurdo Rodríguez – FC Pune City (2016)
 Enrique Esqueda – East Bengal F.C. (2018–2019)
 Gustavö Godinéz – Delhi Dynamos F.C. (2015)
 David Izazola Ramírez – Churchill Brothers SC (2018)
 Ulises Dávila – Delhi Dynamos F.C. (2019)

Moldova
 Petru Leucă – TRAU F.C. (2020)

Montenegro
 Andjelo Rudović – Mohammedan Sporting (2021–2022)
 Darko Nikač – Pune FC (2015)
 Slavko Damjanović – Chennaiyin FC (2021–2022) ATK Mohun Bagan FC (2022–present)
 Vladan Kordić – Gokulam Kerala FC (2022)

Morocco
 Ahmed Jahouh – FC Goa (2017–2020) Mumbai City F.C. (2020–present)
 Hugo Boumous – FC Goa (2018–2020) Mumbai City FC (2020–2021) ATK Mohun Bagan FC (2021–present)
 Faisal Daif – Meghe United Nagpur (2012–2013)
 Noussair El Maimouni – ATK (2018)
 Younes Baltham – Mohammedan S.C. (2012–2014)
 Zaid Krouch – FC Goa (2019)
 Karim Jaouhari – Mohun Bagan A.C. (2008–2009)
 Ahmed Gazi – Meghe United Nagpur (2012–2013)
 Noah Sadaoui – FC Goa (2022–present)

Mozambique
 Eze Collins Pedro – Kenkre FC (2010) Delhi United S.C. (2013–2017)
 Rogério Issufo – Madhya Bharat SC (2017) Pride Sports FC (2018–2019)
 Lúis Vidal Chissano – Gangtok Himalayan SC (2016–2017) Kenkre FC (2021–present)

Myanmar
 Fred Pugsley – East Bengal FC (1942–1945)

Namibia
 Alfred Ndyenge – Southern Samity (2011–2012)
 Quinton Jacobs – United Sikkim FC (2011–2012) Salgaocar SC (2012) Mohun Bagan AC (2012–2013)
 Richard Gariseb – Bhawanipore F.C. (2012–2013), (2014)

Nepal
 Abhishek Rijal – Mohammedan Sporting Club (2020–2021) NEROCA FC (2021)
 Anil Gurung – Shillong Lajong FC (2009–2010)
 Ananta Tamang – Churchill Brothers SC (2020) SC East Bengal (2022)
 Amatya Bahadur – Mahindra United FC (1999)
 Bimal Gharti Magar – Mohun Bagan A.C. (2018) Chhinga Veng FC (2018–2019)
 Bal Gopal Maharjan – Mahindra United FC (2001–2002)
 Dev Narayan Thapa – East Bengal F.C. (1995–1996)
 Ganesh Thapa – East Bengal F.C. (1983–1984)
 Hari Khadka – Tollygunge Agragami (1996–1997) Kerala Police FC (1997–1998) Mahindra United (2000–2001) Mohun Bagan A.C. (2001–2002)
 Kiran Chemjong – Minerva Punjab FC (2018), (2019–2021)
 Kamal Thapa – Pune F.C. (2007–2008) ONGC F.C. (2008–2010)
 Yogesh Gurung – Gangtok Himalayan SC (2016–2017)
 Palsang Lama – Tollygunge Agragami F.C. (2016) United Sikkim F.C. (2012–2013) Minerva Punjab FC (2017)
 Devnarayan Chaudhury – Mohammedan Sporting Club (2000–2001)
 Mani Bikram Shah – Mohammedan Sporting Club (1987–1989)
 Prakash Budhathoki – NEROCA F.C. (2020–2021)
 Rajesh Pariyar – ARA FC (2019–2020)
 Rohit Chand – HAL SC (2010–2012)
 Shyam Babu Kyapchhali – Bhawanipore FC (2018–2019) Mohammedan Sporting Club (2019–2020)
 Narendra Man Singh – Mafatlal Group S.C. (1982–1986) Mahindra United FC (1985–1989)
 Sandip Rai – Mohammedan Sporting Club (2010–2011)
 Bharat Khawas – Pune F.C. (2012)
 Ashim Jung Karki – Royal Wahingdoh FC (2013–2014)
 Upendra Man Singh – Salgaocar SC (1998–1999)
 Bijaya Gurung – Mahindra United FC (2005)
 Sujal Shrestha – Gangtok Himalayan SC (2011)
 Nar Bahadur Thapa – Indian Telephone Industries Limited (1999–2000) Bengal Mumbai FC (2000–2001)
 Omahang Limboo – Madan Maharaj FC (2021–2022)
 Nischal Rokka – Youngsters Club Chandigarh (2018–2019)
 Managya Nakarmi – Kidderpore SC (2022)
 Kamal Shrestha – Gorkha FC Arunachal (2022)
 Kuldip Karki – Railway FC Calcutta (2022–2023)
 Anjan Bista – Mumbai Kenkre (2023–present)

Netherlands
 Bas van den Brink – Churchill Brothers S.C. (2013)
 Darren Sidoel – SC East Bengal (2021–present)
 Gianni Zuiverloon – Delhi Dynamos (2018–2019) Kerala Blasters F.C. (2019–2020)
 Gregory Nelson – Chennaiyin FC (2017–2019)
 Hans Mulder – Delhi Dynamos FC (2014–2015) Chennaiyin FC (2016)
 Jeroen Lumu – Delhi Dynamos (2017–2018)
 John Goossens – FC Pune City (2014)
 Kai Heerings – NorthEast United FC (2019–2020)
 Luc Wulterkens – DSK Shivajians F.C. (2015–2016)
 Mark Sifneos – Kerala Blasters F.C. (2017–2018) FC Goa (2018)
 Riga Mustapha – Pune FC (2013–2014)
 Serginho Greene – Delhi Dynamos FC (2015)
 Stijn Houben – Delhi Dynamos FC (2014)
 Wesley Verhoek – FC Pune City (2015)
 Abdenasser El Khayati – Chennaiyin FC (2022–present)

New Zealand
 Kris William Bright – Kalyani Bharat FC (2014–2015)
 Kayne Vincent – Mumbai F.C. (2009–2010) Churchill Brothers S.C. (2010–2011) Prayag United SC (2011–2013)
 Leo Bertos – Northeast United FC (2014) East Bengal F.C. (2014–2015)

Niger
 Akabougu Chimezie – Golden Threads F.C. (2017–2018)
 Koffi Dan Kowa – Sporting Clube de Goa (2014–2015)
 Joseph Olaniran – Calcutta Customs (2017–2018)
 Yusuf Ahmed Ibrahim – Air India F.C. (2010–2011)
 Abdoul Aziz – Wayanad United FC (2022–present)
 Yacouba Aboubacar – United Sports Club (2022–present)

Nigeria
 Alao Fatai Adisa – Vasco S.C. (2013–2014) Mohun Bagan A.C. (2014)
 Amos Omeje – Air India FC (2013)
 Anyichie Echezona – Southern Samity (2011–2012) Mohun Bagan (2012–2014) Royal Wahingdoh FC (2014–2017) Chennai City F.C. (2017) Mohammedan S.C. (2018) George Telegraph S.C. (2018–2019)
 Emeka Ezeugo – East Bengal F.C. (1986–1987) Mohammedan S.C. (1989–1990) Mohun Bagan A.C. (1997) Churchill Brothers SC (1997–1998)
 Badmus Babatunde – Viva Kerala FC (2006–2009) Salgaocar S.C. (2007) ONGC F.C. (2010–2012) Rangdajied United FC (2012–2013) Royal Wahingdoh FC (2013–2014) Gangtok Himalayan S.C. (2015–2016) Chennai United FC (2016–2017)
 Bala Dahir – Garhwal FC (2014–2015) FC Kerala (2017–2018) Minerva Punjab F.C. (2015–2016) (2018–2019) Garhwal FC (2019–2020) Luca SC (2021–present)
 Bartholomew Ogbeche – Northeast United FC (2018–2019), Kerala Blasters F.C. (2019–present), Mumbai City FC (2020–2021), Hyderabad FC (2021–present)
 Bello Razaq – Viva Kerala FC (2008–2010) United SC (2011–2014) Mohun Bagan A.C. (2015) East Bengal F.C. (2015–16) Prayag United S.C. (2016) Gokulam Kerala FC (2017)
 Nathaniel Amos – Sporting Clube de Goa (2008–2010) Salgaocar S.C. (2011–2012)
 Chidi Edeh – Dempo S.C. (2007–2008), Mahindra United (2008–2009), Mohun Bagan A.C. (2009–2011), Salgaocar SC (2011–2012), East Bengal F.C. (2012–2014)
 Michael Bassey – Shillong Lajong F.C. (2008)
 Chika Wali – Pune FC (2007–2010) Prayag United S.C. (2010–2011) Pune FC (2011–2013) Salgaocar S.C. (2013–2014) Mumbai F.C. (2014–15) Dempo S.C. (2015–2016) Ozone F.C. (2016–2017)
 Christopher Chizoba – Shillong Lajong F.C. (2011–2012) Mohun Bagan A.C. (2013–2014) Lonestar Kashmir F.C. (2015–2016)
 Emmanuel Ini Oyoh – Guwahati FC (2019–2020)
 Daniel Odafin – Shillong Lajong F.C. (2017–2018)
 David Opara – Air India FC (2009–2010) ONGC F.C. (2010–2011) Churchill Brothers S.C. (2011–2012) Mumbai FC (2012–2013) Tuff Laxmi Prasad (2014–2015)
 David Sunday – Chirag United Kerala F.C. (2011–2012) Mohammedan S.C. (2012)
 Donatus Edafe – Minerva Punjab F.C. (2018)
 Dudu Omagbemi – Salgaocar S.C. (2014) East Bengal F.C. (2014–2015) FC Goa (2015) Chennaiyin F.C. (2016) East Bengal F.C. (2017–2018)
 Sunday Ambrose – JCT F.C. (2007–2008)
 Anoure Obiora – Sporting Clube de Goa (2008)
 Ebi Sukore – Mumbai FC (2011–2012) (2014) Shillong Lajong F.C. (2012–2013)
 Echezona Anyichie – Southern Samity (2011–2012) Mohun Bagan A.C. (2012–2014) Royal Wahingdoh (2014–2017) Chennai City F.C. (2017) Mohammedan S.C. (2018) George Telegraph (2018–2020)
 Emmanual Ejiogu – Hindustan Aeronautics Limited (2012–2013) Vasco SC (2014–2015) Techno Aryan (2018–2019) Gokulam Kerala F.C. (2019)
 Ekene Ikenwa – Salgaocar S.C. (2009–2010) (2010–2011) East Bengal F.C. (2010)
 Emmanuel Chigozie – Aizawl F.C. (2016) Gokulam Kerala F.C. (2017–2018) Aryan FC (2018–2019)
 Felix Chidi Odili – Vasco SC (2012) Josco FC (2013) Eagles FC (2014) Calangute Association (2014–2015) Dempo S.C. (2016) NEROCA F.C. (2016–2019)
 Felix Chimaokwu – Churchill Brothers S.C. (2006–2010) Viva Kerala (2010–2011) Mohammedan S.C. (2011–2012)
 Fredrick Okwagbe – Hindustan Aeronautics Limited FC (2005–2007)
 Gbeneme Friday – Mumbai FC (2011–2012) Shillong Lajong F.C. (2012–2013)
 Hammed Adesope – Churchill Brothers S.C. (2013)
 Henry Ezeh – Mumbai FC (2010–2011) Air India FC (2011–2013) Vasco S.C. (2019–present)
 Hassan Odeola – ONGC F.C. (2012–2013)
 Humphrey Zebba – East Bengal FC (1997–1998)
 Izu Azuka – Jamshedpur FC (2017–2018)
 Jagaba Hamza – HAL S.C. (2011–2012) Salgaocar S.C. (2012–2013)
 Joel Sunday – Aizawl F.C. (2016) Gokulam Kerala FC (2018–2019) TRAU F.C. (2020–2020)
 John Chidi Uzodinma – TRAU FC (2019) Mohammedan S.C. (2019–2020) BSS Sporting Club (2020–2021) Mohammedan S.C. (2021–present)
 Jude Nworuh – Chennaiyin FC (2017–2018)
 Julius Akpele – Salgaocar S.C. (2006–2007) East Bengal F.C. (2009–2010)
 Junior Obagbemiro – Sporting Clube de Goa (2008–2010) Chirag United (2010–2011) Salgaocar S.C. (2011–2012) Air India FC (2012–2013)
 Kalu Uche – FC Pune City (2015) Delhi Dynamos FC (2017–2018) ATK (2018–2019)
 Kareem Omolaja – Jammu & Kashmir Bank (2009–2010) JCT Mills F.C. (2010–2011) Royal Wahingdoh FC (2011–2013) Southern Samity (2013–2015) FC Green Valley (2014) Lonestar Kashmir FC (2015) Morning Star FC (2015) Mohammedan Sporting (2015) Minerva Punjab F.C. (2016–2017) Tollygunge Agragami FC (2016) Aizawl F.C. (2017–2019) Minerva Punjab FC (2019) Mohammedan Sporting (2019)
 Kelechi Okoye – Shillong Lajong FC (2010–2011) Rangdajied United FC (2011–2013)
 Kingsley Obumneme – Aizawl F.C. (2017) Mohun Bagan A.C. (2017–2019) Minerva Punjab F.C. (2020–2020)
 Koko Sakibo – Vasco SC (2009–2011) Dempo S.C. (2011–2013) Eagles FC (2013–2014) Tollygunge Agragami FC (2014–2015) FC Bardez Goa (2017)
 Loveday Enyinnaya – Rangdajied United FC (2011–2014) Royal Wahingdoh (2014–2015) Sporting Clube de Goa (2016) Minerva Punjab FC (2017) Real Kashmir F.C. (2018–2020)
 Michael Lucky Kelechuckwu – FC Green Valley (2015–2016) Viva Chennai (2016–2017) Chennai City FC (2017)
 Muisi Ajao – East Bengal F.C. (2005–2006)
 Mohammed Gambo – East Bengal F.C. (2018)
 Monday Osagie – Churchill Brothers SC (2017–2018)
 Muritala Ali – Chirag United SC (2008–2009), Mahindra United (2009–2010), Mohun Bagan A.C. (2010–2011), ONGC F.C. (2011–2013)
 Nathaniel Amos – Sporting Clube de Goa (2007)
 Ndidi Chukwuma – Sporting Clube de Goa (2015–2016)
 Odafa Okolie – Mohammedan S.C. (2003–2004) Churchill Brothers S.C. (2005–2011) Mohun Bagan A.C. (2011–2014) Churchill Brothers SC (2014–2015) Sporting Clube de Goa (2015–2016) Gokulam Kerala F.C. (2018)
 Ogba Kalu Nnanna – Churchill Brothers S.C. (2007–2010) Dempo S.C. (2010–2011), Sporting Clube de Goa (2011–2014) Churchill Brothers SC (2017–2018)
 Oguchi Uche – TRAU F.C. (2019–2020)
 Ojimi Obatola – Salgaocar S.C. (2013)
 Oluwaunmi Somide – Gokulam FC (2017–2018)
 Orok Essien – Kenkre FC (2011–2012) George Telegraph S.C. (2012–2013) Mumbai F.C. (2013) East Bengal F.C. (2014–2015) Morning Star FC (2015–2016) Viva Chennai (2016) Bhawanipore FC (2016–2017) Minerva Punjab FC (2019) Aryan FC (2020–2021)
 Penn Orji – East Bengal F.C. (2010–2013) Mohammedan Sporting Club (2013–2014) Kerala Blasters F.C. (2014) Shillong Lajong F.C. (2015–2016)
 Peter Omoduemuke – Churchill Brothers (2017)
 Philip Njoku – Minerva Punjab F.C. (2018–2019)
 Ranti Martins – Dempo S.C. (2004–2012) United Sports Club (2012–2014) Rangdajied United F.C. (2014) East Bengal F.C. (2014–2016)
 Victor Amobi – Minerva Punjab FC (2017) Forward Club Tripura (2019–2020)
 Uga Okpara – East Bengal F.C. (2009–2014) Tollygunge Agragami F.C. (2014–2015)
 Dolphine Bernard – Mohammedan S.C. (2015–2016)
 Justice Morgan – Chennai City FC (2016–2017) George Telegraph S.C. (2018–2020) Aizawl F.C. (2013–2016) (2020–2020)
 Kingsley Chukwu Chioma – Mumbai F.C. (2011)
 Joseph Olaleye – TRAU F.C. (2019–2020)
 Majekodunmi Bolaji – Dempo S.C. (2006–2007) East Bengal FC (2007–2008)
 Michael Segum Tayo – Sporting Clube De Goa (2008–2009) Air India FC (2009–2010) Southern Samity (2011–2012)
 Beili Nurien – East Bengal FC (1997–1998)
 Oneyama Eke – ONGC F.C. (2012–2013)
 Gbenga Lawal Abiodun – Salgaocar S.C. (1999–2000)
 Ekomobong Victor Philip – Kenkre F.C. (2018) Garhwal F.C. (2019–2020)
 Eric Obinna Chukwunyelu – Churchill Brothers S.C. (2017–2018)
 Adebayo Gbadebo – Mohun Bagan A.C. (1999–2000)
 Henry Okara – Dempo S.C. (1998–1999)
 Friday Elaho – F.C. Kochin (1994–19995) Mohun Bagan A.C. (1998–1999)
 Louis Nigi Ebami – Chirag United FC (2008–2009)
 Waheed Adekunle – George Telegraph S.C. (2013–2014) Prayag United (2014) Ramhlun North FC (2018–2019)
 Abeeku Gaiesi – East Bengal FC (2007–2008)
 Stephen Eze – Jamshedpur FC (2020–2021)
 Henry Chukwukei – Mohammedan S.C. (2004–2005)
 Yusuf Ibrahim – Mumbai FC (2007–2008) Air India FC (2009–2011)
 Godwin Ogambah Pepehlyne – Bengal Mumbai FC (2000–2001)
 Egware Charles Efemena – Simla Youngs FC (2009) Calcutta Port Trust (2010) Aryan FC (2011–2012) Sporting Clube De Goa (2016)
 Benson Oladetan – Bengal Mumbai FC (2007–2008)
 Adebayo Gbadebo – Mohun Bagan A.C. (1998–1999)
 Jallaluddin Farid – East Bengal FC (1994–1995)
 Lukman Adefemi – Real Kashmir F.C. (2020–present)
 Nnabuike Praise – Air India FC (2011)
 Onyeama Okechukwu – Tezpur United FC (2012–2013) Southern Samity (2014) Laxmi Prasad S.C. (2015) Eagles FC (2016) Churchill Brothers S.C. (2017–2018)
 Obasi Moses Louis – Aryan FC (2015–2016)
 Bright Enobakhare – S.C. East Bengal (2020–2021)
 Stephen Harry – George Telegraph S.C. (2018) Mohammedan S.C. (2018–2019)
 Adeshin Sadiq – Bengal Mumbai FC (2002–2003)
 Valentine Euzengo – Salgaocar S.C. (1997–1999) Vasco SC (1999–2000)
 Ernest Jeremiah – East Bengal FC (2004–2005)
 Ibe Ikechukwu Gift – East Bengal FC (2007–2008)
 Habib Adenkule – Salgaocar SC (1998–1999) Vasco S.C. (1999–2000)
 Sherifdeen Adenekan – Salgaocar SC (1998–1999) Tollygunge Agragami FC (1999–2000)
 Salau Nuruddin – Tollygunge Agragami FC (2011–2013) FC Green Valley (2012) United Sikkim F.C. (2012–2013) Prayag United (2014) Mohammedan S.C. (2015–2016) Pathachakra FC (2017–2018)
 Emeka Achilefu – JCT Mills FC (1997–1998) Bengal Mumbai FC (1998–1999) Mohun Bagan A.C. (1999–2000)
 Mike Okoro – East Bengal F.C. (2002–2004)
 Monda Adams – Bengal Mumbai FC (2000–2001)
 Princewill Emeka – NEROCA F.C. (2016) TRAU F.C. (2017–2018) Mohammedan S.C. (2018–2019) TRAU FC (2019–2020) Aizawl F.C. (2020–2021)
 Bolane Kazeem Amobi – George Telegraph S.C. (2015–2016) Aryan FC (2016–2017)
 Stanley Okoroigwe – Aryan FC (2010) Mohammedan S.C. (2011–2012) Mohun Bagan A.C. (2012–2013) George Telegraph S.C. (2013–2014)
 Raphael Onwrebe – Mohammedan S.C. (2020–2021)
 Chukwudi Chukwuma – SESA FC Goa (2012–2013)
 Bisiriyu Adowake Fatai – Indian Bank Recreational Club (1998–1999)
 Emmanuel Ini Oyoh – Guwahati FC (2015–2016)
 Sunday Chizoba Nwadialu – Churchill Brothers S.C. (2014–2015)
 Anorue Obiora Richard – Sporting Clube de Goa (2011–2012)
 Peter Omoduemuke – Churchill Brothers FC (2017–2018)
 Johnny Akujebi – East Bengal F.C. (1987–1988)
 Daniel Chima Chukwu – SC East Bengal (2021–2022) Jamshedpur FC (2022–present)
 Remi Martins – Hindustan FC (2017–2018)
 Harrison Chukwuji – Samaleswari SC (2012–2013)
 Chisom Chikatara – Gokulam Kerala FC (2021–2022)
 Kenneth Ikechukwu – Churchill Brothers (2021–present)
 Agwu Somtochukwu Richard – Southern Samity (2017) Tollygunge Agragami (2018–2019) Rainbow AC (2019–2020) Peerless SC (2020–2021)
 Francis Nwankwo – Kerala United FC (2021–present)
 Richard Agwu Somtochukwu – Shirsh Bihar United FC (2021)
 Nwalioba Alexander Uderica – FC Kerala (2021–present)
 Emmanuel Jeremiah Ohja – Gokulam Kerala Reserves (2021–present)
 Ogana Ugochukwu Louis – Sreenidi Deccan FC (2022–present)
 Abiola Dauda – Mohammedan Sporting (2022–present)
 Sylvester Igboun – NorthEast United FC (2022)
 Valentine Nwabili – FC Agniputhra (2022–present)

Northern Cyprus
 Billy Osman Mehmet – Dempo S.C. (2013)

Northern Ireland
 Aaron Hughes – Kerala Blasters F.C. (2016)
 Martin Paterson – ATK (2018)

North Macedonia
 Hristijan Denkovski – Gokulam Kerala F.C. (2018)
 Vlatko Drobarov – Kerala Blasters FC (2019–2020)

Norway
 John Arne Riise – Delhi Dynamos FC (2015) Chennaiyin FC (2016–2017)
 Kristian Opseth – Bengaluru F.C. (2020–2021)

Pakistan
 Abdul Ghafoor Majna – Mohammedan Sporting (1958–1959)
 Kashif Siddiqi – Real Kashmir FC (2019–2020)
 Taj Mohammed – East Bengal FC (1949)
 Syed Abdus Samad – Calcutta Town Club (1912–1915) Calcutta Orients Club (1918) Mohammedan Sporting (1933–1938)
 Jamil Akhtar – East Bengal FC (1954–1955)
 Masood Fakhri – East Bengal FC (1951–1952)
 Niaz Ahmed – East Bengal FC (1953–1954)
 F. R. Khan – East Bengal FC (1953–1954)
 Samir Nabi – Delhi Dynamos FC (2016–2017)
 Musa Ghazi – Mohammedan Sporting (1945–1947) East Bengal (1956–1957)
 Mohammad Omar Baloch – Mohammedan Sporting (1959–1962)
 Mohammad Ghazi – East Bengal FC (1954–1955)
 Masood-ul-Hassan Butt – East Bengal FC (1956–1957)
 Sambal Khan – East Bengal FC (1955–1956)
 Muhammad Qasim – East Bengal FC (1954–1955)
 Muhammad Umer – Mohammedan Sporting (1956–1960)

Palestine
 Carlos Salom – Chennaiyin FC (2018–2019)
 Omar Jarun – Kalyani Bharat F.C. (2015)

Panama
 Ronaldo Dinolis – Gokulam Kerala F.C. (2016)
 Rogelio Juárez – Lonestar Kashmir FC (2021) Corbett FC (2021–present)

Paraguay
 Enzo Prono – Aizawl FC (2018)

Philippines
 Ángel Guirado – Salgaocar F.C. (2012)
 Álvaro Alonso – Quartz FC Calicut (2016–2017)

Poland
 Ariel Borysiuk – Chennaiyin FC (2021–2022)
 Łukasz Gikiewicz – Chennaiyin FC (2021–2022)
 Martins Ekwueme – Sporting Clube de Goa (2013–2014)

Portugal
 Eurípedes Amoreirinha – Churchill Brothers S.C. (2013)
 Filipe Azevedo – Mahindra United FC (2006–2007)
 João Coimbra – Kerala Blasters FC (2015)
 Henrique Dinis – Delhi Dynamos FC (2014)
 Miguel Garcia – NorthEast United FC (2014) Sporting Clube de Goa (2015) NorthEast United FC (2015)
 Jose Goncalves – NorthEast United (2017–2018)
 Miguel Herlein – FC Goa (2014)
 Edinho Júnior – Shillong Lajong F.C. (2013)
 Hugo Machado – Churchill Brothers S.C. (2013)
 Edgar Marcelino – FC Goa (2014) Pune FC (2015)
 Bruno Pinheiro – FC Goa (2014) (2017–2018)
 Hélder Postiga – Atlético de Kolkata (2015–2016)
 André Preto – Mumbai City FC (2014)
 Tiago Ribeiro – Mumbai City FC (2014)
 Simão Sabrosa – NorthEast United FC (2015)
 Luis Carlos Nogueira Santos – Fateh Hyderabad A.F.C. (2016–2017)
 Henrique Sereno – Atlético de Kolkata (2016) Chennaiyin FC (2017–2018)
 Hélio Pinto – NorthEast United FC (2018)
 Silas – NorthEast United FC (2015)
 José Soares – Salgaocar S.C. (2008)
 Zequinha – Atlético de Kolkata (2017–2018)
 Paulo Machado – Mumbai City FC (2018–2020)
 Sócrates Pedro – Churchill Brothers S.C. (2020)
 Jose Martin – Churchill Brothers S.C. (1998–1999)
 Hilário Leal – Vasco S.C. (1999–2000)
 Luís Machado – NorthEast United FC (2020–2021)
 Elinton Andrade – FC Goa (2015)
 Dennis Cabral – Salgaocar S.C. (1998–1999) Vasco SC (2000–2001)
 Bruno Anciães – Kenkre FC (2013)
 Domingos Jesus Gomes Lopes – Kenkre FC (2012–2013)
 Rodilson Felisberto Dias – Kenkre FC (2013–2014)
 Gabriel Orphão Dos Anjos – Rebels FC Bangalore (2018–2019)

Puerto Rico
 Sidney Adam Rivera – Chennaiyin F.C. (2018)

Republic of Ireland
 Anthony Pilkington – SC East Bengal (2020–2021)
 John Devine (footballer, born 1958) – East Bengal F.C. (1987–1998)
 Andy Keogh – NorthEast United FC (2020)
 Michael Collins – Bengaluru FC (2016)
 Carl McHugh – ATK (2019) ATK Mohun Bagan FC (2020–present)
 Colin Falvey – Kerala Blasters FC (2014)
 Robbie Keane – Atlético de Kolkata (2017–2018)
 Shane McFaul – DSK Shivajians F.C. (2016–2017)
 Darren O'Dea – Mumbai City FC (2015)
 Graham Stack – Kerala Blasters FC (2016)

Romania
 Andrei Ionescu – Aizawl F.C. (2017–2018)
 Adrian Mutu – FC Pune City (2015)
 Dan Ignat – Shillong Lajong F.C. (2017)
 Dragoș Firțulescu – Chennaiyin FC (2019–2020)
 Lucian Goian – Mumbai City (2016–2019) Chennaiyin F.C. (2019–2020)

Russia
 Sergei Vladimirovich Markin – Mohun Bagan A.C. (1994)
 Vallery Igoroviç – Mohun Bagan A.C. (1996)
 Sergey Andreev – Dempo S.C. (2001–2002)

Rwanda
 Atuheire Kipson – Gokulam Kerala FC (2020)
 Aimable Nsabimana – Minerva Punjab F.C. (2018)
 Jimmy Mulisa – HAL SC (2003–2004)
 Lewis Aniweta – Sporting Clube De Goa (2002–2003) East Bengal FC (2003–2004) Fransa-Pax FC (2004–2005) Mohammedan SC (2005)

Saint Kitts and Nevis
 Gerard Geron Williams – TRAU F.C. (2019–2020; 2021–2022)

Saint Lucia
 Sherwin Emmanuel – Southern Samity A.C. (2012–2013)

Saint Martin
 Cyril Kali – Kerala Blasters FC (2018–2019)

Saint Vincent and the Grenadine
 Caswain Mason – Mahindra United FC (2007)
 Cornelius Stewart – Minerva Punjab F.C. (2019)

São Tomé and Príncipe
 Léonildo Soãres Gonçalves – Chennai City FC (2017)

Scotland
 Alan Gow – East Bengal FC (2011–2012)
 Brad Inman – ATK Mohun Bagan FC (2020–2021) Odisha FC (2021) Mumbai City FC (2021–2022)
 Darryl Duffy – Salgaocar SC (2013–2016) FC Goa (2015), Mohun Bagan A.C. (2016–2017)
 Danny Fox – SC East Bengal (2020–2021) 
 Martin Scott – Salgaocar SC (2015–2016)
 Mason Robertson – Real Kashmir FC (2018–2022)
 Jamie McAllister – Kerala Blasters FC (2014)
 Peter Maguire – East Bengal F.C. (1990–1991)
 Greg Stewart – Jamshedpur FC (2021–2022) Mumbai City FC (2022–present)
 Scott Ritchie – Ozone FC (2017)
 Stephen Pearson – Kerala Blasters FC (2014), Atletico de Kolkata (2016)

Senegal
 Kassim Aidara – Minerva Punjab FC (2017–2018) East Bengal FC (2018–2020)
 Badara Badji – Delhi Dynamos FC (2016)
 Diawandou Diagne – Odisha FC (2019–2021)
 Diomansy Kamara – NorthEast United FC (2015)
 Elhadji Ousseynou Ndoye – Kerala Blasters FC (2016)
 Ibrahima Niasse – Delhi Dynamos FC (2016)
 Kamara E.O – Sports Academy Tirur (2019–2020)
 Massamba Sambou – NorthEast United FC (2014) 
 Momar Ndoye – FC Pune City (2016) 
 Mouhamadou Moustapha Gning – Kerala Blasters FC (2019–2020)
 Mourtada Fall – FC Goa (2018–2020) Mumbai City FC (2020–present)
 Modou Sougou – Mumbai City FC (2018–2020)
 Lamine Tamba – Mahindra United FC (2007–2010), Pune F.C. (2010–2011), Air India F.C. (2011–12), Churchill Brothers S.C. (2012–13), Rangdajied United F.C. (2013–2016) Real Kashmir F.C. (2017)
 Talla N'Diaye – Jamshedpur FC (2017)
 Victor Mendy – NorthEast United (2015)
 Demba Diakhaté – Mumbai Tigers F.C. (2012–2014)
 Papa Niang – Minerva Punjab F.C. (2018–2019)
 Papa Babacar Diawara – Mohun Bagan AC (2020) RoundGlass Punjab FC (2021)
 Dieye Hamidou – ARA FC (2019–2021) Muthoot FA (2022)
 Seila Toure – SAT Tirur (2021–2022)
 Zakaria Diallo – NorthEast United (2022)
 Momo Cisse – Churchill Brothers FC (2022–present)
 Fallou Diagne – Chennaiyin FC (2022–present)
 Ousmane N'Diaye – Mohammedan Sporting (2022–present)
 Abdoulaye Sané – Churchill Brothers FC (2022–present)
 Auguste Somlaga – Gokulam Kerala FC (2022–present)

Serbia
 Aleksandar Rakić – Chennai City FC (2018)
 Jan Muzangu – Chennai City FC (2019–2020)
 Aleksandar Šujdović – HAL SC (2011–2012)
 Andrija Kaluđerović – Delhi Dynamos F.C. (2018–2019)
 Dejan Lekić – Atletico de Kolkata (2015)
 Demir Avdić – Chennai City FC (2020–2021)
 Damir Grgič – FC Pune City (2017–2018)
 Slaviša Stojanović – Kerala Blasters FC (2018–2019)
 Svetozar Mijin – Mahindra United FC (2009–2010)
 Marjan Jugović – Bengaluru FC (2017)
 Marko Klisura – Mumbai City FC (2018–2019)
 Nemanja Lakić-Pešić – Kerala Blasters FC (2017–2019)
 Nikola Krčmarević – Kerala Blasters FC (2018–2019)
 Nikola Stojanović – Mohammedan Sporting (2021–2022)
 Elvedin Škrijelj – Chennai City FC (2020–2021)
 Stefan Ilić – Mohammedan Sporting (2021–2022)
 Aleksandar Ignjatović – RoundGlass Punjab FC (2022–present)

Sierra Leone
 Mohamed Kallon – Chirag United Kerala F.C. (2011–2012)
 Dixon Alusine – Peerless SC (2021–2022)
 David Simbo – Gokulam Kerala FC (2022) NEROCA FC (2022–present)

Singapore
 Iqbal Hamid Hussain – Chennai City FC (2020–2021)
 John Wilkinson – Salgaocar FC (2013)
 Precious Emuejeraye – Churchill Brothers FC (2017)

Slovakia
 Jozef Kapláň – Chennai City F.C. (2018–2019)
 Jakub Sylvestr – Chennaiyin FC (2020–2021)

Slovenia

 Matej Poplatnik – Kerala Blasters (2018–2019)
 Amir Dervišević – SC East Bengal (2021–2022)
 Rene Mihelič – Chennaiyin FC (2017–2018) Delhi Dynamos F.C. (2018–2019)
 Luka Majcen – Churchill Brothers S.C. (2020–2021) FC Bengaluru United (2021–2022) Gokulam Kerala FC (2022) RoundGlass Punjab FC (2022–present)
 Uroš Poljanec – Chennai City FC (2017–2018)

Somalia
 Mboyo Iyomi Tusevo – Churchill Brothers S.C. (2007–2008) Dempo S.C. (2008–2009)

South Africa
 Cole Alexander – Odisha FC (2020–2021)
 Sameehg Doutie – Atlético de Kolkata (2015–2016) Jamshedpur FC (2017–2018)
 Abdullah Hamza Amaba – HAL SC (2012–2013) Salgaocar S.C. (2013–2014)
 MacDonald Mukansi – East Bengal FC (2007–2008)
 Sibongakonke Mbatha – ATK (2017–2018)
 Mbaka Bokembe Dady – Mahindra United FC (2006–2007)
 Sydney Nkalanga – East Bengal F.C. (2005–2006) Fransa-Pax FC (2005–2006)
 Lwandile Mzizi – RFC Kochi (2018–2020)
 William Twala – Madan Maharaj FC (2021)

South Korea
 Do Dong-Hyun – Northeast United FC (2014) East Bengal FC (2015–2016)
 Kim Dong-hyeon – Chennai City F.C. (2018)
 Oh Joo-ho – Shillong Lajong FC (2017–2018)
 Oh Ddog-yi – Churchill Brothers S.C. (2010)
 Kim Soo Hyun – Indian Telephone Industries Limited (1999–2000)
 Park Jae-Hyun – Sporting Clube de Goa (2012)
 Sang-Min Kim – Minerva Punjab (2017)
 Yoon Tae – United Sikkim FC (2012–2013)
 Park Kwang-il – FC Pune City (2014)
 Shin Ho-jun – Rangdajied United FC (2013–2014)
 Son Yong-chan – Ozone FC (2017–2018)
 Shin Dong Hun – Indian Telephone Industries Limited (1998–1999)
 Park Jong-oh – Real Kashmir FC (2021–2022)

South Sudan
 James Moga – Sporting Clube de Goa (2011) Pune FC (2012–2013) East Bengal F.C. (2013–2014) Mohammedan S.C. (2016) Rangdajied United F.C. (2016–2017)

Spain
 Adolfo Miranda – Chennai City FC (2019–2020)
 Agustín García Íñiguez – ATK (2019–2020)
 Aitor Fernández – Mumbai City FC (2015)
 Aitor Monroy – Jamshedpur FC (2019–2021)
 Alvaro Rubio – Bengaluru FC (2016)
 Álex Barrera – Bengaluru FC (2019)
 Adrián Colunga – FC Goa (2017–2018)
 Andrea Orlandi – Chennaiyin F.C. (2018–2019)
 Albert Serrán – Bengaluru FC (2018–2020)
 Ángel Berlanga – Sporting Clube de Goa (2013)
 Antonio Dovale (Toni) – Bengaluru FC (2017–2018) East Bengal F.C. (2019)
 Adrià Carmona – Delhi Dynamos FC (2018–2019)
 Aridane Santana – Odisha FC (2019–2020) Hyderabad FC (2020–2021)
 Arnal Llibert – Atletico de Kolkata (2014)
 Arturo Navarro – Sporting Clube de Goa (2013–2014)
 Basilio Sancho – Atletico de Kolkata (2014)
 Borja Gómez Pérez – East Bengal F.C. (2018–2020)
 Borja Fernández – Atletico de Kolkata (2014–2016)
 Braulio Nóbrega – Bengaluru FC (2017–2018)
 Bruno Herrero Arias – Delhi Dynamos FC (2014) NorthEast United FC (2015) FC Pune City (2016)
 Carlos Calvo Sobrado – Jamshedpur FC (2018–2019)
 Carlos Delgado – Odisha FC (2019–2020; 2022–present)
 Carlos Marchena – Kerala Blasters FC (2015)
 Carlos Peña – FC Goa (2018–2020)
 Chechi – FC Goa (2017–2018)
 Cristian Hidalgo – Chennaiyin FC (2014)
 Ferran Corominas – FC Goa (2017–2020)
 Cristian Bustos – Mumbai City FC (2015)
 David Grande Serrano – Jamshedpur FC (2020–2021)
 Daniel Lucas Segovia – Bengaluru FC (2018)
 Dani Mallo – Atletico de Kolkata (2016)
 Dimas Delgado – Bengaluru FC (2017–2021)
 Edu Bedia – FC Goa (2017–present)
 Edu García – Bengaluru FC (2017–2018) ATK (2019–2020) ATK Mohun Bagan FC (2020–2021) Hyderabad FC (2021–2022)
 Edu Moya – Delhi Dynamos FC (2017–2018)
 Eduardo Silva Lerma – Chennaiyin FC (2014–2015)
 Francisco Dorronsoro – Delhi Dynamos FC (2018–2019) Odisha FC (2019–2020)
 Fran González Muñoz – Mohun Bagan A.C. (2019–2020) Bengaluru FC (2020–2021) Real Kashmir (2021–present)
 Francisco Morante Martínez – Mohun Bagan A.C. (2019–2020)
 Gonzalo Hinojal – Sporting Clube de Goa (2013–2014)
 Iñigo Calderón – Chennaiyin FC (2017–2019)
 Jesús Tato – FC Pune City (2016)
 Javi Fernández – Mumbai City FC (2014)
 Javi Lara – Atletico de Kolkata (2015–2016)
 Jaime Gavilán – Atletico de Kolkata (2015) Chennaiyin FC (2017–2018)
 Jaime Santos Colado – East Bengal F.C. (2018–2020)
 Javi Hernández – ATK (2019–2020) ATK Mohun Bagan FC (2020–2021) Odisha FC (2021–2022) Bengaluru FC (2022–present)
 Joan Capdevila – NorthEast United FC (2014)
 Joaquin Garcia – Churchill Brothers S.C. (2019)
 Jonathan Vila – FC Pune City (2018–2019)
 Joseba Beitia – Mohun Bagan A.C. (2019–2020) RoundGlass Punjab FC (2020–present)
 Jofre Mateu – Atletico de Kolkata (2014) FC Goa (2015–2016)
 Jordi Montel – Atletico de Kolkata (2017–2018)
 Jorge Alonso – Atletico de Kolkata (2015)
 Josemi – Atletico de Kolkata (2014–2015)
 Josué Currais Prieto – Kerala Blasters FC (2015–2016)
 Juan Antonio González – Bengaluru FC (2016–2021) Hyderabad FC (2021–present)
 Juan Aguilera – Mumbai City FC (2015)
 Juan Belencoso – Atletico de Kolkata (2016)
 Juan Calatayud – Atletico de Kolkata (2015)
 Juan Mera Gonzaléz – East Bengal F.C. (2019–2020)
 Juan Quero – DSK Shivajians F.C. (2016–17) Minerva Punjab F.C. (2019)
 Juanfri – Sporting Clube de Goa (2013)
 Julen Colinas – Mohun Bagan A.C. (2019–2020)
 Manuel Jesús Ortiz (Lolo) – FC Pune City (2018)
 Luis García – Atletico de Kolkata (2014)
 Luisma – Bengaluru F.C. (2019)
 Mandi – ATK (2020)
 Manuel Arana Rodríguez – FC Goa (2017–2018) Delhi Dynamos FC (2018)
 Manuel Lanzarote – FC Goa (2017–2018) ATK (2018–2019) Chennaiyin F.C. (2021)
 Manuel Onwu – Bengaluru F.C. (2019–2020) Odisha FC (2020–2021)
 Marcos dé la Espada – East Bengal F.C. (2019–2020)
 Marcos Tébar – Delhi Dynamos FC (2016) FC Pune City (2017–2018) Delhi Dynamos FC (2018–2019) Odisha FC (2019–2020)
 Mario Arqués – Jamshedpur FC (2018–2019) Kerala Blasters FC (2019–2020)
 Martí Crespí – Delhi Dynamos FC (2018–2019) East Bengal FC (2019–2020)
 Miguel Palanca – FC Goa (2018–2019)
 Nauzet Santana – Chennai City FC (2018–2020)
 Nili Pérdemo – Bengaluru FC (2020)
 Noé Acosta – Jamshedpur FC (2019–2020)
 Néstor Gordillo – Chennai City FC (2018–2019) Hyderabad FC (2019–2020)
 Pablo Gallardo – Sporting Clube de Goa (2014) Atletico de Kolkata (2016)
 Pablo Morgado – Jamshedpur FC (2018–2019)
 Pablo Rodríguez – United Sikkim F.C. (2012–2013)
 Pedro Manzi Cruz – Chennai City FC (2018–2020) Mohammedan SC (2021) FC Bengaluru United (2021–2022) Rajasthan United FC (2022–present)
 Piti – Jamshedpur FC (2019–2020)
 Pitu – FC Pune City (2016)
 Rafa – FC Pune City (2017–2018) Hyderabad FC (2019–2020)
 Rafa Jordà – Mumbai City FC (2017–2018)
 Roberto Eslava – Chennai City F.C. (2018–2020)
 Rubén González – Delhi Dynamos FC (2016)
 Salva Chamorro – Mohun Bagan AC (2019–2020)
 Sandro Rodríguez – Chennai City FC (2018–2020)
 Sergio Castel – Jamshedpur FC (2019–2020)
 Sergio Cidoncha – Jamshedpur FC (2018–2019) Kerala Blasters FC (2019–2020)
 Tiri – Atletico de Kolkata (2015–2016) Jamshedpur FC (2017–2020) ATK Mohun Bagan FC (2020–2022)
 Toni Doblas – Delhi Dynamos FC (2015–2016)
 Victor Pulga – Kerala Blasters FC (2014) (2018)
 Vicente Gómez Umpiérrez – Kerala Blasters FC (2020–2021)
 Víctor Mongil – ATK (2020) Odisha FC (2021–2022) Kerala Blasters FC (2022–present)
 Xabi Irureta – Delhi Dynamos FC (2018)
 Xisco Hernández – Bengaluru FC (2018–2019) Odisha FC (2019–2020) Bengaluru FC (2021)
 Alberto Noguera – FC Goa (2020–2022)
 Iván González – FC Goa (2020–2022) East Bengal (2022–present)
 Jorge Ortiz Mendoza – FC Goa (2020–2022)
 Igor Angulo – FC Goa (2020–2021) Mumbai City FC (2021–2022)
 Hernán Santana – Mumbai City FC (2020–2021) NorthEast United FC (2021–2022)
 Francisco Sandaza – Hyderabad FC (2020–2021)
 Odei Onaindia – Hyderabad FC (2020–2021; 2022–present)
 Lluís Sastre – Hyderabad FC (2020–2021)
 Juande Prados López – Kerala Blasters FC (2020–2021)
 Héctor Rodas – Odisha FC (2021–2022)
 Airam López Cabrera – FC Goa (2021–2022)
 Álvaro Vázquez – Kerala Blasters FC (2021–2022) FC Goa (2022–present)
 Javier Siverio – Hyderabad FC (2021–present)
 Aridai Cabrera – Odisha FC (2021–2022) East Bengal Club (2022–present)
 Sergio Mendigutxia – NEROCA FC (2021–present)
 Francisco José Sota – SC East Bengal (2022)
 Omar Ramos Suárez – Rajasthan United FC (2022–present)
 Iker Guarrotxena Vallejo – FC Goa (2022–present)
 Marc Valiente – FC Goa (2022–present)
 Saúl Crespo Prieto – Odisha FC (2022–present)
 Pedro Martín Moreno – Odisha FC (2022–present)
 Víctor Rodríguez – Odisha FC (2022–present)
 Borja Herrera – Hyderabad FC (2022–present)
 Pedro Tanausú Domínguez – Churchill Brothers (2022–present)
 Jon Gaztañaga – NorthEast United FC (2022–present)
 Manuel Cordero Giuli – Churchill Brothers (2022–present)
 Pablo Pérez – Bengaluru FC (2022–present)

Sri Lanka

 Anton Silva – Indian Bank Recreational Club (1998–1999)
 Mohammed Nizam Pakir Ali – Vasco SC Goa (1986–1987)
 Selim Noor – East Bengal F.C. (1961–1962)
 Charitha Mudiyanselage – FC Kerala (2020)
 Abdul Azeez Rehman – Indian Bank Recreational Club (2003–2004)
 Kamaldeen Fuard – Indian Bank Recreational Club (2003–2004)
 Kasun Nadika Jayasuriya – Indian Bank Recreational Club (2002–2003) Dempo S.C. (2003–2004)
 Imran Mohammed – Indian Bank Recreational Club (2002–2003)
 Mohideen Mohamed Rawme – Indian Bank Recreational Club (2003–2004)
 Roshan Perera – Mohun Bagan A.C. (1998–1999)
 TN Bagoos – Indian Bank Recreational Club (1999–2001) Dempo S.C. (2002)
 Peter Wilfred – East Bengal FC (1955–1956)
 Channa Ediri Bandanage – Dempo S.C. (2002–2003)
 A.S. Mahendran – Indian Bank Recreational Club (2002–2003)
 Mohamed Izzadeen – Dempo S.C. (2010–2011)
 Hammed Mohammed Nazir – Indian Bank Recreational Club (1998–1999)
 Ahmed Waseem Razeek – Gokulam Kerala FC (2022–present)

Suriname
 Roland Alberg – Hyderabad FC (2020–2021)

Sweden
 Bojan Djordjic – Chennaiyin FC (2014–2015)
 Freddie Ljungberg – Mumbai City FC (2014)
 Maic Sema – NorthEast United FC (2018)
 Pierre Jonas Tillman – Chennaiyin FC (2014)
 Simon Lundevall – NorthEast United FC (2020)
 George Ekeh – Mohun Bagan A.C. (2002–2003) Churchill Brothers S.C. (2005–2007)
 Simon Azoulay Pedersen – Chirag United Kerala F.C. (2011–2012)
 Nicolas Nath – Sporting Clube De Goa (2006–2007)
 Ulf Johansson – East Bengal F.C. (1996–1997)

Switzerland
 Marco Pittà – Churchill Brothers S.C. (2003–2004)
 Jan Bergér – East Bengal F.C. (2009) Dempo SC (2009)
 P.K. Anil Kumar – Salgaocar S.C. (2007–2008)

Syria
 Ahmad Al Kaddour – Churchill Brothers S.C. (2013)
 Hasan Al Moustafa – Prayag United S.C. (2013–2014)
 Khaled Al Saleh – Gokulam Kerala F.C. (2017)
 Mahmoud Al Amnah – Sporting Clube De Goa (2015–2016) Aizawl F.C. (2017) East Bengal F.C. (2017–2018) Minerva Punjab F.C. (2019) Southern Samity (2019–2020)
 Naser Al Sebai – Churchill Brothers S.C. (2013)
 Yasser Shahen – Churchill Brothers S.C. (2013)
 Taha Dyab – Real Kashmir F.C. (2018)
 Shaher Shaheen – Mohammedan S.C. (2021–present)
 Wael Ayan – Mohammedan S.C. (2017–2018)
 Fares Arnaout – FC Goa (2022–present)

Tanzania
 Ally Mayay Tembele – East Bengal F.C. (2001–2002)
 Yonah Elias Ndabila – Peerless SC (2015)

Tajikistan
 Komron Tursunov – Mohun Bagan AC (2020) TRAU FC (2020–2021) Rajasthan United FC (2021–2022) Churchill Brothers (2022) TRAU FC (2022–present)
 Rustam Zabirov – Vasco S.C. (2000–2001)
 Suhrob Solehov – Southern Samity (2015–2016) Vajra United FC (2016–2017)
 Fatkhullo Fatkhuloev – Chennaiyin FC (2020–2021)
 Bakhtior Kalandarov – Aizawl FC (2022–present)
 Nuriddin Davronov – Mohammedan Sporting (2022–present)
 Daler Yodgorov – Gokulam Kerala FC (2022–present)
 Nozim Babadjanov – Real Kashmir FC (2022–present)
 Shavkati Khotam – Sudeva Delhi FC (2023–present)

Thailand
 Dusit Chalermsan – Mohun Bagan A.C. (1999–2001)
 Jatvpong Thongsukh – Mohun Bagan A.C. (2000–2001)
 Wisoot Bunpeng – Viva Kerala F.C. (2009)

Tibet
 Tashi Tsering – Gangtok Himalayan S.C. (2009–2010)
 Tenzin Dhondup – Shillong United (2017–2019)
 Tenzin Samdup – Chennai City FC (2018–2019) Real Kashmir FC (2019–2020) Kenkre FC (2021–present)
 Tashi Samphel – Gangtok Himalayan S.C. (2017–2018)
 Tsering Dhundup – R.S.C. Calicut (2006–2007)
 Dawa Tsering – Dhanglob Rukhag (2003–2007) Potala FC (2007)
 Pema Lhundup – Gangtok Himalayan S.C. (2018–2019)
 Tamding Tsering – Uttar Pradesh Police (1997–1999)
 Tsering Dorjee – Dharmashala Club (2004–2006)
 Tenzin Tsephel – Garhwal Heroes FC (2009) Sikkim Aakraman FC (2015–2017)
 Tenzin Bhakdo – DYSA Mundgod (2021–present)
 Tenzin Norbu Tekhang – Dhondupling FC (2020–present)

Timor-Leste
 Murilo de Almeida – Chennai City FC (2017–2018)
 Thiago Oliveira Fernandes – Gokulam Kerala FC (2018–2019)
 Thiago Santos Cunha – Mumbai City FC (2016)

Togo
 Dosseh Attivi – United Sikkim F.C. (2012–2013)
 Gaty Kouami – NEROCA F.C. (2019–2020)
 Gley Yao Rodrigue – Mohun Bagan A.C. (2005)
 Raphaël Patron Akakpo – Mahindra United F.C. (2003–2005)
 Sekle Yao Zico – NEROCA F.C. (2019–2020)
 Sogan Kokou – United Sikkim F.C. (2012–2013)

Trinidad and Tobago
 Andre Ettienne – Gokulam Kerala F.C. (2019–2020)
 Anthony Wolfe – Churchill Brothers S.C. (2013–2014) Sporting Clube de Goa (2014–2015) Churchill Brothers S.C. (2017) (2018–2019) Peerless SC (2019–2020)
 Carlyle Mitchell – East Bengal F.C. (2017)
 Daneil Cyrus – Mohun Bagan A.C. (2019–2020)
 Densill Theobald – Dempo S.C. (2012–2013) Royal Wahingdoh (2015) Sporting Clube de Goa (2016) Mumbai F.C. (2017)
 Cornell Glen – Shillong Lajong F.C. (2013–2015) NorthEast United FC (2014) Mohun Bagan A.C. (2015–2016) Ozone FC (2016–2017) Bengaluru FC (2017)
 Cyd Gray – Pune F.C. (2008)
 Daniel Carr – FC Bengaluru United (2021–present)
 Judah García – NEROCA F.C. (2020–2021)
 Marcus Joseph – Gokulam Kerala F.C. (2019–2020)
 Marvin Phillip – NEROCA F.C. (2019–2020)
 Nathaniel Garcia – Gokulam Kerala F.C. (2019–2020) NEROCA F.C. (2020–present)
 Neil Michael Benjamin – Kerala United FC (2019–2020) 
 Radanfah Abu Bakr – Churchill Brothers S.C. (2019–2020)
 Glenton Wolfe – Churchill Brothers S.C. (2014) Sporting Club de Goa (2014–2015)
 Richard Roy – NEROCA F.C. (2017–2018)
 Robert Primus – Minerva Punjab FC (2019) Churchill Brothers S.C. (2019–2020) FC Bengaluru United (2020–2021) Aizawl FC (2022–present)
 Russell Ralph Alfred – Gokulam Kerala F.C. (2018–2019)
 Taryk Sampson – NEROCA F.C. (2019–2020)
 Tony Warner – NorthEast United FC (2015–2016)
 Willis Déon Plaza – East Bengal F.C. (2017–2018) Mohammedan S.C. (2018) Churchill Brothers S.C. (2018–2019) Mohammedan S.C. (2020)
 Omari Abiel Bairad – Gokulam Kerala Reserves (2022–present)

Tunisia
 Amine Chermiti – Mumbai City FC (2019–2020)
 Hamdi Marzouki – Salgaocar S.C. (2011–2012)
 Mohamed Larbi – Mumbai City FC (2019–2020)
 Selim Benachour – Mumbai City FC (2015)

Turkey
 Tuncay Şanlı – FC Pune City (2015)

Turkmenistan
 Nurjan Komekov – Almora Burans (2016–2017) Vajra United F.C. (2018–2020)

Uganda
 Brian Umony – Gokulam Kerala F.C. (2017–2018)
 Henry Kisekka – Gokulam Kerala FC (2018) Mohun Bagan AC (2018–2019) Gokulam Kerala FC (2019–2020) Bhawanipore FC (2021–2022) Mohammedan SC (2022) Aizawl FC (2022–present)
 Isaac Isinde  – TRAU F.C. (2019–2020)
 Ivan Bukenya – East Bengal FC (2016)
 Khalid Aucho – East Bengal F.C. (2018) Churchill Brothers SC (2018–2019)
 Boban Zirintusa – Mohun Bagan AC (2018)
 Kizito Keziron – Kerala Blasters FC (2017–2019)
 Michael Ajayi – Mohammedan S.C. (2004) Tollygunge Agragami (2005)
 Richard Kasagga – Aizawl FC (2019–2021)
 Bakali Kasule – Air India F.C. (2019–2020)
 Musa Mudde – Gokulam Kerala FC (2017–2018) Sports Academy Tirur (2018–2019) Mohammedan S.C. (2019–2020)
 Habib Kavuma – Southern Samity (2022–present)

Ukraine
 Andriy Malchevsky – Churchill Brothers S.C. (1999–2000) East Bengal F.C. (2000–2001)
 Mykola Shevchenko – Churchill Brothers S.C. (1999–2000) Dempo S.C. (2001)
 Alexy Drobotov – Dempo S.C. (1998–1999) Churchill Brothers S.C. (1999–2000)
 Roland Rasel Bilala – Minerva Punjab F.C. (2019)
 Ronaque Bakshi – Chhinga Veng F.C. (2018–2020) Hindustan FC (2018–2019)
 Ivan Kalyuzhnyi – Kerala Blasters FC (2022–present)

United Arab Emirates
 Badar Khail – Gokulam Kerala FC (2017)

United States of America
 Avneet Shergill – Salgaocar FC (2009–2010)
 Jonny Campbell – FC Bengaluru United (2020)
 Samuel Bradley – Kenkre FC Mumbai (2016–2017)
 Joseph Lapira – United Sikkim FC (2011)
 Spencer Johnson – Kenkre FC Mumbai (2016)

Uruguay
 Adrián Luna Retamar – Kerala Blasters FC (2021–present)
 Diego Forlán – Mumbai City FC (2016)
 Emiliano Alfaro – NorthEast United FC (2016) FC Pune City (2017–2018) ATK (2018)
 Federico Gallego – NorthEast United FC (2018–2022) ATK Mohun Bagan FC (2023–present)
 Juan Cruz Mascia – NorthEast United FC (2018–2019)
 Martín Cháves – NorthEast United FC (2019–2020) Rajasthan United FC (2022–present)
 Martín Díaz – NorthEast United FC (2017–2018), FC Pune City (2018–2019)
 Matías Mirabaje – Delhi Dynamos FC (2017–2018) Mumbai City F.C. (2018–2019)
 Sasha Aneff Rosso – NorthEast United FC (2016)
 Walter Ibáñez – Mumbai City FC (2016)

Uzbekistan
 Azamat Abduraimov – Mohammedan Sporting Club (1991–1992) Salgaocar S.C. (1999–2000)
 Olim Talliev – East Bengal F.C. (2000–2001)
 Vladislav Nuriev – Fateh Hyderabad A.F.C. (2017–2018) ARA FC (2021–present)
 Evgeniy Kochnev – Gokulam Kerala FC (2018) 
 Golum Urunov – Gokulam Kerala FC (2017)
 Ilhom Sharipov – East Bengal F.C. (2000–2001)
 Sergey Tokov – Pune FC (2009–2010) Chirag United Kerala FC (2010–2011)
 Igor Shkvyrin – Mohun Bagan AC (1999–2000) Churchill Brothers S.C. (2000–2001)
 Kashimov Awazbek – Vasco S.C. (2000–2001)
 Sherzod Nazarov – Vasco S.C. (2008–2009)
 Ravshan Teshabaev – Vasco S.C. (2008–2009)
 Ibrahim Kabba – Sports Academy Tirur (2016–2017)
 Tuychiev Nodirjon – Ahbab FC (2017–2018)
 Sergey Nikolay Andreyev – Dempo S.C. (2002–2003)
 Anvar Jabborov – Vasco S.C. (1999–2000)
 Arslan Talipov – Dempo S.C. (2001–2002)
 Maksim Nikolaev – Dempo S.C. (2000–2001)
 Yorqin Nazarov – Vasco S.C. (2008–2009)
 Akobir Turaev – TRAU FC (2021–2022)
 Olimjon Karimov – Aizawl FC (2021–2022)
 Sardor Jakhonov – Rajasthan United FC (2022) NEROCA FC (2022–present)
 Mirzhamol Kosimov – NEROCA FC (2022–present)
 Otabek Zokirov – Rajasthan United FC (2023–present)
 Samandar Ochilov – Mumbai Kenkre FC (2023–present)

Venezuela
 Gabriel Cichero – Delhi Dynamos FC (2017–2018)
 Miku Fédor – Bengaluru FC (2017–2019)

Vietnam
 Dinh Văn Tâ – Churchill Brothers SC (2017)
 Lê Văn Tân – Gokulam Kerala FC (2018)

Wales
 Aaron Amadi-Holloway – SC East Bengal (2020–2021)
 David Rhys Cotterill – ATK (2018)

Yemen
 Khaled Hasan Baleid – Salgaocar F.C. (2015)
 Aiman Al-Hagri – Shillong Lajong F.C. (2017–2018)

Zambia
 Aaron Katebe – Real Kashmir F.C. (2018–2020)
 Kondwani Mtonga – Shillong Lajong F.C. (2013–2014) NorthEast United FC (2014–2015)
 Isaac Chansa – NorthEast United FC (2014) Shillong Lajong FC (2014–2015)
 Francis Kasonde – Salgaocar F.C. (2014–2015)
 Sipho Mumbi – Dolo Mando FC (2010)

Zimbabwe
 Costa Nhamoinesu – Kerala Blasters FC (2020–2021)
 Oscar Hunda – Churchill Brothers (2000)
 Noel Tafadzwa Kaseke – Mohun Bagan A.C. (2003–2004)
 Tapera Madzima – Churchill Brothers S.C. (1998–1999) FC Kochin (1999–2000)
 Simbarashe Gate – Mohammedan Sporting Club (2013), (2015–2016)
 Victor Kamhuka – Pathachakra FC (2017–2018) Bhawanipore FC (2019)
 David Makandawire – Mohammedan Sporting Club (2005–2007) (2009–2011)
 Matthew Tendai – United Sports (2021–2022)
 Davis Jelvas Kamanga – United Sports (2021–2022) NEROCA FC (2022–present)
 Ian Nekati – United Sports (2022)

Players in World Cup
Players who have represented their nations at the FIFA World Cup.

See also

Main Pages
List of football clubs in India
List of foreign Indian Super League players
List of Indian Super League marquees
List of Indian players in foreign leagues
Indian football league system
Category
Expatriate footballers in India
List of I-League players
List of I-League 2nd Division players
Indian expatriate footballers
Others
Football in India
State football leagues in India
Indian football clubs in Asian competitions

Notes

References

External links
 Best Asians to have played in India at Goal.com
 Top foreign signings of each team in ISL 2020-21 at Insidesport.co
 Why foreign footballers are big in Calcutta at BBC.com
 Indian football homecoming: Foreign players who came back for a second stint at Goal.com
 Why footballers are starting to leave Australia A-League for India’s ISL at Scroll.in
 Indian football: Fred Pugsley, Chima Okorie, Ranti Martins – the foreign strikers who shone in India at Scroll.in
 15 International Footballers To Watch Out For In The Indian Super League at Scoopwhoop.com
 Indian football: Top Spanish players to have played in India at Goal.com
 Foreign recruits in Indian football – A short recap at Indianfooty.net
 ISL 2020-21: Asian overseas players of all the clubs at Goal.com
 The most popular football clubs: India at the-afc.com (AFC)
 List of Foreign Players to Play for East Bengal Club from 1942 at eastbengalclubrecords.wordpress.com
 History of the I-League at i-league.org
 Africans kicking in Indian football: A snapshot at Rediff.com
 Five I-League foreign greats who would’ve shone in ISL at Khel Now

I-League players
Expatriate footballers in India
India
Association football player non-biographical articles